

253001–253100 

|-bgcolor=#fefefe
| 253001 ||  || — || September 5, 2002 || Anderson Mesa || LONEOS || — || align=right | 1.8 km || 
|-id=002 bgcolor=#fefefe
| 253002 ||  || — || September 5, 2002 || Anderson Mesa || LONEOS || — || align=right | 1.2 km || 
|-id=003 bgcolor=#fefefe
| 253003 ||  || — || September 5, 2002 || Socorro || LINEAR || NYS || align=right data-sort-value="0.89" | 890 m || 
|-id=004 bgcolor=#fefefe
| 253004 ||  || — || September 5, 2002 || Socorro || LINEAR || — || align=right | 1.2 km || 
|-id=005 bgcolor=#E9E9E9
| 253005 ||  || — || September 5, 2002 || Socorro || LINEAR || — || align=right | 1.8 km || 
|-id=006 bgcolor=#FA8072
| 253006 ||  || — || September 6, 2002 || Socorro || LINEAR || H || align=right data-sort-value="0.67" | 670 m || 
|-id=007 bgcolor=#d6d6d6
| 253007 ||  || — || September 5, 2002 || Socorro || LINEAR || 3:2 || align=right | 6.0 km || 
|-id=008 bgcolor=#E9E9E9
| 253008 ||  || — || September 5, 2002 || Socorro || LINEAR || — || align=right | 1.4 km || 
|-id=009 bgcolor=#FA8072
| 253009 ||  || — || September 5, 2002 || Socorro || LINEAR || H || align=right | 1.1 km || 
|-id=010 bgcolor=#fefefe
| 253010 ||  || — || September 5, 2002 || Haleakala || NEAT || MAS || align=right | 1.0 km || 
|-id=011 bgcolor=#fefefe
| 253011 ||  || — || September 6, 2002 || Socorro || LINEAR || H || align=right data-sort-value="0.81" | 810 m || 
|-id=012 bgcolor=#d6d6d6
| 253012 ||  || — || September 5, 2002 || Socorro || LINEAR || SHU3:2 || align=right | 5.6 km || 
|-id=013 bgcolor=#fefefe
| 253013 ||  || — || September 7, 2002 || Socorro || LINEAR || — || align=right | 1.1 km || 
|-id=014 bgcolor=#E9E9E9
| 253014 ||  || — || September 7, 2002 || Socorro || LINEAR || — || align=right | 1.3 km || 
|-id=015 bgcolor=#fefefe
| 253015 ||  || — || September 11, 2002 || Drebach || Drebach Obs. || — || align=right data-sort-value="0.92" | 920 m || 
|-id=016 bgcolor=#fefefe
| 253016 ||  || — || September 12, 2002 || Palomar || NEAT || — || align=right data-sort-value="0.92" | 920 m || 
|-id=017 bgcolor=#E9E9E9
| 253017 ||  || — || September 13, 2002 || Palomar || NEAT || — || align=right | 1.4 km || 
|-id=018 bgcolor=#E9E9E9
| 253018 ||  || — || September 13, 2002 || Anderson Mesa || LONEOS || MIT || align=right | 3.4 km || 
|-id=019 bgcolor=#fefefe
| 253019 ||  || — || September 12, 2002 || Palomar || NEAT || — || align=right | 1.2 km || 
|-id=020 bgcolor=#fefefe
| 253020 ||  || — || September 12, 2002 || Palomar || NEAT || — || align=right | 1.0 km || 
|-id=021 bgcolor=#fefefe
| 253021 ||  || — || September 13, 2002 || Palomar || NEAT || — || align=right | 1.4 km || 
|-id=022 bgcolor=#fefefe
| 253022 ||  || — || September 15, 2002 || Haleakala || NEAT || — || align=right | 1.3 km || 
|-id=023 bgcolor=#fefefe
| 253023 ||  || — || September 8, 2002 || Haleakala || R. Matson || — || align=right | 1.3 km || 
|-id=024 bgcolor=#fefefe
| 253024 ||  || — || September 14, 2002 || Palomar || NEAT || — || align=right | 1.4 km || 
|-id=025 bgcolor=#fefefe
| 253025 ||  || — || September 14, 2002 || Palomar || NEAT || — || align=right | 1.4 km || 
|-id=026 bgcolor=#d6d6d6
| 253026 ||  || — || September 8, 2002 || Haleakala || NEAT || HIL3:2 || align=right | 6.5 km || 
|-id=027 bgcolor=#fefefe
| 253027 ||  || — || September 14, 2002 || Palomar || NEAT || — || align=right | 1.2 km || 
|-id=028 bgcolor=#fefefe
| 253028 ||  || — || September 13, 2002 || Palomar || NEAT || — || align=right | 1.2 km || 
|-id=029 bgcolor=#fefefe
| 253029 ||  || — || September 11, 2002 || Palomar || NEAT || — || align=right | 1.1 km || 
|-id=030 bgcolor=#fefefe
| 253030 ||  || — || September 13, 2002 || Anderson Mesa || LONEOS || — || align=right | 1.3 km || 
|-id=031 bgcolor=#fefefe
| 253031 ||  || — || September 13, 2002 || Palomar || NEAT || V || align=right data-sort-value="0.95" | 950 m || 
|-id=032 bgcolor=#fefefe
| 253032 ||  || — || September 4, 2002 || Palomar || NEAT || — || align=right data-sort-value="0.95" | 950 m || 
|-id=033 bgcolor=#fefefe
| 253033 ||  || — || September 4, 2002 || Palomar || NEAT || NYS || align=right data-sort-value="0.76" | 760 m || 
|-id=034 bgcolor=#fefefe
| 253034 ||  || — || September 27, 2002 || Palomar || NEAT || H || align=right data-sort-value="0.75" | 750 m || 
|-id=035 bgcolor=#fefefe
| 253035 ||  || — || September 27, 2002 || Palomar || NEAT || MAS || align=right data-sort-value="0.96" | 960 m || 
|-id=036 bgcolor=#fefefe
| 253036 ||  || — || September 26, 2002 || Palomar || NEAT || — || align=right data-sort-value="0.68" | 680 m || 
|-id=037 bgcolor=#d6d6d6
| 253037 ||  || — || September 28, 2002 || Goodricke-Pigott || R. A. Tucker || 3:2 || align=right | 8.0 km || 
|-id=038 bgcolor=#fefefe
| 253038 ||  || — || September 27, 2002 || Palomar || NEAT || — || align=right | 1.4 km || 
|-id=039 bgcolor=#fefefe
| 253039 ||  || — || September 27, 2002 || Anderson Mesa || LONEOS || NYS || align=right data-sort-value="0.82" | 820 m || 
|-id=040 bgcolor=#d6d6d6
| 253040 ||  || — || September 29, 2002 || Haleakala || NEAT || Tj (2.95) || align=right | 5.8 km || 
|-id=041 bgcolor=#d6d6d6
| 253041 ||  || — || September 28, 2002 || Haleakala || NEAT || HIL3:2 || align=right | 6.4 km || 
|-id=042 bgcolor=#fefefe
| 253042 ||  || — || September 29, 2002 || Haleakala || NEAT || H || align=right data-sort-value="0.74" | 740 m || 
|-id=043 bgcolor=#d6d6d6
| 253043 ||  || — || September 29, 2002 || Haleakala || NEAT || 3:2 || align=right | 4.1 km || 
|-id=044 bgcolor=#E9E9E9
| 253044 ||  || — || September 29, 2002 || Haleakala || NEAT || — || align=right data-sort-value="0.97" | 970 m || 
|-id=045 bgcolor=#fefefe
| 253045 ||  || — || September 28, 2002 || Palomar || NEAT || NYS || align=right data-sort-value="0.92" | 920 m || 
|-id=046 bgcolor=#fefefe
| 253046 ||  || — || September 25, 2002 || Kvistaberg || UDAS || H || align=right | 1.00 km || 
|-id=047 bgcolor=#E9E9E9
| 253047 ||  || — || September 30, 2002 || Socorro || LINEAR || — || align=right | 1.4 km || 
|-id=048 bgcolor=#fefefe
| 253048 ||  || — || September 16, 2002 || Haleakala || NEAT || — || align=right | 1.2 km || 
|-id=049 bgcolor=#E9E9E9
| 253049 || 2002 TD || — || October 1, 2002 || Anderson Mesa || LONEOS || — || align=right | 1.0 km || 
|-id=050 bgcolor=#fefefe
| 253050 ||  || — || October 1, 2002 || Anderson Mesa || LONEOS || NYS || align=right | 1.0 km || 
|-id=051 bgcolor=#fefefe
| 253051 ||  || — || October 1, 2002 || Anderson Mesa || LONEOS || NYS || align=right data-sort-value="0.77" | 770 m || 
|-id=052 bgcolor=#fefefe
| 253052 ||  || — || October 2, 2002 || Socorro || LINEAR || — || align=right | 1.2 km || 
|-id=053 bgcolor=#fefefe
| 253053 ||  || — || October 2, 2002 || Socorro || LINEAR || — || align=right | 1.6 km || 
|-id=054 bgcolor=#E9E9E9
| 253054 ||  || — || October 2, 2002 || Socorro || LINEAR || BRU || align=right | 2.6 km || 
|-id=055 bgcolor=#fefefe
| 253055 ||  || — || October 2, 2002 || Socorro || LINEAR || H || align=right data-sort-value="0.80" | 800 m || 
|-id=056 bgcolor=#E9E9E9
| 253056 ||  || — || October 2, 2002 || Socorro || LINEAR || — || align=right | 1.5 km || 
|-id=057 bgcolor=#E9E9E9
| 253057 ||  || — || October 2, 2002 || Socorro || LINEAR || — || align=right | 1.7 km || 
|-id=058 bgcolor=#fefefe
| 253058 ||  || — || October 4, 2002 || Socorro || LINEAR || H || align=right data-sort-value="0.95" | 950 m || 
|-id=059 bgcolor=#fefefe
| 253059 ||  || — || October 3, 2002 || Socorro || LINEAR || H || align=right | 1.3 km || 
|-id=060 bgcolor=#fefefe
| 253060 ||  || — || October 7, 2002 || Socorro || LINEAR || H || align=right | 1.1 km || 
|-id=061 bgcolor=#E9E9E9
| 253061 ||  || — || October 10, 2002 || Eskridge || G. Hug || — || align=right | 1.4 km || 
|-id=062 bgcolor=#FFC2E0
| 253062 ||  || — || October 10, 2002 || Socorro || LINEAR || AMO || align=right data-sort-value="0.22" | 220 m || 
|-id=063 bgcolor=#fefefe
| 253063 ||  || — || October 3, 2002 || Palomar || NEAT || V || align=right | 1.0 km || 
|-id=064 bgcolor=#E9E9E9
| 253064 ||  || — || October 1, 2002 || Anderson Mesa || LONEOS || — || align=right | 1.2 km || 
|-id=065 bgcolor=#fefefe
| 253065 ||  || — || October 2, 2002 || Haleakala || NEAT || — || align=right | 1.5 km || 
|-id=066 bgcolor=#fefefe
| 253066 ||  || — || October 2, 2002 || Haleakala || NEAT || H || align=right data-sort-value="0.80" | 800 m || 
|-id=067 bgcolor=#fefefe
| 253067 ||  || — || October 3, 2002 || Socorro || LINEAR || — || align=right data-sort-value="0.89" | 890 m || 
|-id=068 bgcolor=#d6d6d6
| 253068 ||  || — || October 3, 2002 || Palomar || NEAT || HIL3:2 || align=right | 8.4 km || 
|-id=069 bgcolor=#FA8072
| 253069 ||  || — || October 2, 2002 || Haleakala || NEAT || — || align=right data-sort-value="0.78" | 780 m || 
|-id=070 bgcolor=#E9E9E9
| 253070 ||  || — || October 3, 2002 || Palomar || NEAT || — || align=right | 3.6 km || 
|-id=071 bgcolor=#fefefe
| 253071 ||  || — || October 4, 2002 || Palomar || NEAT || — || align=right | 1.5 km || 
|-id=072 bgcolor=#fefefe
| 253072 ||  || — || October 4, 2002 || Palomar || NEAT || — || align=right | 1.4 km || 
|-id=073 bgcolor=#d6d6d6
| 253073 ||  || — || October 4, 2002 || Socorro || LINEAR || — || align=right | 5.1 km || 
|-id=074 bgcolor=#E9E9E9
| 253074 ||  || — || October 4, 2002 || Anderson Mesa || LONEOS || GER || align=right | 1.5 km || 
|-id=075 bgcolor=#E9E9E9
| 253075 ||  || — || October 3, 2002 || Palomar || NEAT || — || align=right | 2.8 km || 
|-id=076 bgcolor=#fefefe
| 253076 ||  || — || October 3, 2002 || Palomar || NEAT || SVE || align=right | 2.9 km || 
|-id=077 bgcolor=#fefefe
| 253077 ||  || — || October 4, 2002 || Socorro || LINEAR || V || align=right data-sort-value="0.90" | 900 m || 
|-id=078 bgcolor=#fefefe
| 253078 ||  || — || October 4, 2002 || Socorro || LINEAR || — || align=right | 1.5 km || 
|-id=079 bgcolor=#fefefe
| 253079 ||  || — || October 4, 2002 || Socorro || LINEAR || — || align=right | 1.2 km || 
|-id=080 bgcolor=#E9E9E9
| 253080 ||  || — || October 4, 2002 || Socorro || LINEAR || — || align=right | 1.2 km || 
|-id=081 bgcolor=#E9E9E9
| 253081 ||  || — || October 4, 2002 || Socorro || LINEAR || — || align=right | 1.1 km || 
|-id=082 bgcolor=#d6d6d6
| 253082 ||  || — || October 7, 2002 || Socorro || LINEAR || 3:2 || align=right | 6.9 km || 
|-id=083 bgcolor=#E9E9E9
| 253083 ||  || — || October 7, 2002 || Haleakala || NEAT || — || align=right | 2.0 km || 
|-id=084 bgcolor=#fefefe
| 253084 ||  || — || October 7, 2002 || Socorro || LINEAR || NYS || align=right data-sort-value="0.82" | 820 m || 
|-id=085 bgcolor=#E9E9E9
| 253085 ||  || — || October 8, 2002 || Anderson Mesa || LONEOS || EUN || align=right | 1.5 km || 
|-id=086 bgcolor=#E9E9E9
| 253086 ||  || — || October 6, 2002 || Socorro || LINEAR || — || align=right | 2.2 km || 
|-id=087 bgcolor=#fefefe
| 253087 ||  || — || October 9, 2002 || Anderson Mesa || LONEOS || — || align=right | 1.5 km || 
|-id=088 bgcolor=#fefefe
| 253088 ||  || — || October 10, 2002 || Palomar || NEAT || — || align=right | 1.1 km || 
|-id=089 bgcolor=#E9E9E9
| 253089 ||  || — || October 7, 2002 || Socorro || LINEAR || — || align=right | 1.0 km || 
|-id=090 bgcolor=#fefefe
| 253090 ||  || — || October 8, 2002 || Anderson Mesa || LONEOS || NYS || align=right | 1.6 km || 
|-id=091 bgcolor=#fefefe
| 253091 ||  || — || October 8, 2002 || Anderson Mesa || LONEOS || — || align=right | 2.0 km || 
|-id=092 bgcolor=#E9E9E9
| 253092 ||  || — || October 9, 2002 || Socorro || LINEAR || — || align=right | 2.4 km || 
|-id=093 bgcolor=#fefefe
| 253093 ||  || — || October 10, 2002 || Socorro || LINEAR || H || align=right data-sort-value="0.87" | 870 m || 
|-id=094 bgcolor=#E9E9E9
| 253094 ||  || — || October 10, 2002 || Socorro || LINEAR || HNS || align=right | 1.7 km || 
|-id=095 bgcolor=#fefefe
| 253095 ||  || — || October 9, 2002 || Socorro || LINEAR || V || align=right | 1.1 km || 
|-id=096 bgcolor=#fefefe
| 253096 ||  || — || October 9, 2002 || Socorro || LINEAR || — || align=right | 1.8 km || 
|-id=097 bgcolor=#fefefe
| 253097 ||  || — || October 9, 2002 || Socorro || LINEAR || — || align=right | 1.4 km || 
|-id=098 bgcolor=#E9E9E9
| 253098 ||  || — || October 10, 2002 || Socorro || LINEAR || — || align=right | 1.3 km || 
|-id=099 bgcolor=#E9E9E9
| 253099 ||  || — || October 4, 2002 || Apache Point || SDSS || — || align=right | 2.0 km || 
|-id=100 bgcolor=#E9E9E9
| 253100 ||  || — || October 5, 2002 || Apache Point || SDSS || — || align=right | 1.2 km || 
|}

253101–253200 

|-bgcolor=#fefefe
| 253101 ||  || — || October 10, 2002 || Apache Point || SDSS || — || align=right data-sort-value="0.88" | 880 m || 
|-id=102 bgcolor=#d6d6d6
| 253102 ||  || — || October 9, 2002 || Palomar || NEAT || HIL3:2 || align=right | 6.9 km || 
|-id=103 bgcolor=#E9E9E9
| 253103 ||  || — || October 15, 2002 || Palomar || NEAT || — || align=right | 1.4 km || 
|-id=104 bgcolor=#E9E9E9
| 253104 || 2002 UP || — || October 25, 2002 || Pla D'Arguines || Pla D'Arguines Obs. || — || align=right | 1.0 km || 
|-id=105 bgcolor=#E9E9E9
| 253105 ||  || — || October 28, 2002 || Socorro || LINEAR || — || align=right | 4.7 km || 
|-id=106 bgcolor=#FFC2E0
| 253106 ||  || — || October 29, 2002 || Palomar || NEAT || APO +1kmslow || align=right | 1.7 km || 
|-id=107 bgcolor=#fefefe
| 253107 ||  || — || October 28, 2002 || Socorro || LINEAR || H || align=right data-sort-value="0.99" | 990 m || 
|-id=108 bgcolor=#fefefe
| 253108 ||  || — || October 28, 2002 || Palomar || NEAT || V || align=right | 1.1 km || 
|-id=109 bgcolor=#fefefe
| 253109 ||  || — || October 30, 2002 || Socorro || LINEAR || H || align=right data-sort-value="0.99" | 990 m || 
|-id=110 bgcolor=#E9E9E9
| 253110 ||  || — || October 30, 2002 || Palomar || NEAT || — || align=right | 1.3 km || 
|-id=111 bgcolor=#E9E9E9
| 253111 ||  || — || October 28, 2002 || Haleakala || NEAT || — || align=right | 1.3 km || 
|-id=112 bgcolor=#fefefe
| 253112 ||  || — || October 31, 2002 || Palomar || NEAT || H || align=right data-sort-value="0.81" | 810 m || 
|-id=113 bgcolor=#E9E9E9
| 253113 ||  || — || October 31, 2002 || Anderson Mesa || LONEOS || — || align=right | 1.2 km || 
|-id=114 bgcolor=#E9E9E9
| 253114 ||  || — || October 31, 2002 || Socorro || LINEAR || — || align=right | 1.9 km || 
|-id=115 bgcolor=#fefefe
| 253115 ||  || — || October 30, 2002 || Apache Point || SDSS || CIM || align=right | 2.2 km || 
|-id=116 bgcolor=#fefefe
| 253116 ||  || — || October 29, 2002 || Apache Point || SDSS || — || align=right | 2.8 km || 
|-id=117 bgcolor=#E9E9E9
| 253117 ||  || — || October 31, 2002 || Palomar || NEAT || — || align=right | 1.6 km || 
|-id=118 bgcolor=#E9E9E9
| 253118 ||  || — || October 16, 2002 || Palomar || NEAT || — || align=right data-sort-value="0.99" | 990 m || 
|-id=119 bgcolor=#E9E9E9
| 253119 ||  || — || October 28, 2002 || Palomar || NEAT || — || align=right | 1.5 km || 
|-id=120 bgcolor=#E9E9E9
| 253120 ||  || — || November 2, 2002 || La Palma || La Palma Obs. || — || align=right | 1.1 km || 
|-id=121 bgcolor=#E9E9E9
| 253121 ||  || — || November 2, 2002 || Haleakala || NEAT || — || align=right | 1.6 km || 
|-id=122 bgcolor=#E9E9E9
| 253122 ||  || — || November 1, 2002 || Palomar || NEAT || — || align=right | 1.3 km || 
|-id=123 bgcolor=#E9E9E9
| 253123 ||  || — || November 1, 2002 || Palomar || NEAT || — || align=right | 1.4 km || 
|-id=124 bgcolor=#E9E9E9
| 253124 ||  || — || November 1, 2002 || Palomar || NEAT || — || align=right | 1.8 km || 
|-id=125 bgcolor=#E9E9E9
| 253125 ||  || — || November 1, 2002 || Haleakala || NEAT || — || align=right | 1.4 km || 
|-id=126 bgcolor=#fefefe
| 253126 ||  || — || November 3, 2002 || Socorro || LINEAR || H || align=right data-sort-value="0.97" | 970 m || 
|-id=127 bgcolor=#fefefe
| 253127 ||  || — || November 5, 2002 || Socorro || LINEAR || H || align=right data-sort-value="0.85" | 850 m || 
|-id=128 bgcolor=#fefefe
| 253128 ||  || — || November 6, 2002 || Socorro || LINEAR || H || align=right | 1.0 km || 
|-id=129 bgcolor=#fefefe
| 253129 ||  || — || November 7, 2002 || Socorro || LINEAR || H || align=right data-sort-value="0.89" | 890 m || 
|-id=130 bgcolor=#E9E9E9
| 253130 ||  || — || November 4, 2002 || Powell || Powell Obs. || ADE || align=right | 1.7 km || 
|-id=131 bgcolor=#E9E9E9
| 253131 ||  || — || November 4, 2002 || Haleakala || NEAT || — || align=right | 1.2 km || 
|-id=132 bgcolor=#E9E9E9
| 253132 ||  || — || November 5, 2002 || Socorro || LINEAR || — || align=right | 2.5 km || 
|-id=133 bgcolor=#E9E9E9
| 253133 ||  || — || November 5, 2002 || Socorro || LINEAR || — || align=right | 1.1 km || 
|-id=134 bgcolor=#E9E9E9
| 253134 ||  || — || November 5, 2002 || Socorro || LINEAR || — || align=right | 3.5 km || 
|-id=135 bgcolor=#E9E9E9
| 253135 ||  || — || November 5, 2002 || Fountain Hills || Fountain Hills Obs. || — || align=right | 1.2 km || 
|-id=136 bgcolor=#E9E9E9
| 253136 ||  || — || November 4, 2002 || Palomar || NEAT || — || align=right | 2.7 km || 
|-id=137 bgcolor=#E9E9E9
| 253137 ||  || — || November 5, 2002 || Palomar || NEAT || — || align=right | 1.2 km || 
|-id=138 bgcolor=#E9E9E9
| 253138 ||  || — || November 5, 2002 || Palomar || NEAT || — || align=right | 1.3 km || 
|-id=139 bgcolor=#E9E9E9
| 253139 ||  || — || November 5, 2002 || Socorro || LINEAR || — || align=right | 1.3 km || 
|-id=140 bgcolor=#E9E9E9
| 253140 ||  || — || November 3, 2002 || Haleakala || NEAT || — || align=right | 1.2 km || 
|-id=141 bgcolor=#E9E9E9
| 253141 ||  || — || November 4, 2002 || Palomar || NEAT || KON || align=right | 5.2 km || 
|-id=142 bgcolor=#E9E9E9
| 253142 ||  || — || November 5, 2002 || Palomar || NEAT || — || align=right | 1.6 km || 
|-id=143 bgcolor=#E9E9E9
| 253143 ||  || — || November 6, 2002 || Anderson Mesa || LONEOS || VIB || align=right | 2.7 km || 
|-id=144 bgcolor=#E9E9E9
| 253144 ||  || — || November 7, 2002 || Socorro || LINEAR || — || align=right | 1.3 km || 
|-id=145 bgcolor=#fefefe
| 253145 ||  || — || November 7, 2002 || Socorro || LINEAR || SUL || align=right | 2.7 km || 
|-id=146 bgcolor=#E9E9E9
| 253146 ||  || — || November 7, 2002 || Socorro || LINEAR || — || align=right | 1.0 km || 
|-id=147 bgcolor=#fefefe
| 253147 ||  || — || November 7, 2002 || Socorro || LINEAR || — || align=right | 1.0 km || 
|-id=148 bgcolor=#fefefe
| 253148 ||  || — || November 7, 2002 || Socorro || LINEAR || — || align=right | 1.4 km || 
|-id=149 bgcolor=#fefefe
| 253149 ||  || — || November 7, 2002 || Socorro || LINEAR || V || align=right | 1.1 km || 
|-id=150 bgcolor=#E9E9E9
| 253150 ||  || — || November 7, 2002 || Socorro || LINEAR || — || align=right | 2.1 km || 
|-id=151 bgcolor=#E9E9E9
| 253151 ||  || — || November 7, 2002 || Socorro || LINEAR || — || align=right | 1.2 km || 
|-id=152 bgcolor=#E9E9E9
| 253152 ||  || — || November 7, 2002 || Socorro || LINEAR || EUN || align=right | 3.0 km || 
|-id=153 bgcolor=#fefefe
| 253153 ||  || — || November 12, 2002 || Socorro || LINEAR || — || align=right | 1.4 km || 
|-id=154 bgcolor=#E9E9E9
| 253154 ||  || — || November 12, 2002 || Socorro || LINEAR || — || align=right | 1.1 km || 
|-id=155 bgcolor=#fefefe
| 253155 ||  || — || November 12, 2002 || Socorro || LINEAR || — || align=right | 1.6 km || 
|-id=156 bgcolor=#E9E9E9
| 253156 ||  || — || November 12, 2002 || Socorro || LINEAR || — || align=right | 2.2 km || 
|-id=157 bgcolor=#E9E9E9
| 253157 ||  || — || November 12, 2002 || Socorro || LINEAR || — || align=right | 1.6 km || 
|-id=158 bgcolor=#E9E9E9
| 253158 ||  || — || November 12, 2002 || Palomar || NEAT || — || align=right | 2.8 km || 
|-id=159 bgcolor=#E9E9E9
| 253159 ||  || — || November 12, 2002 || Palomar || NEAT || — || align=right | 4.4 km || 
|-id=160 bgcolor=#E9E9E9
| 253160 ||  || — || November 12, 2002 || Palomar || NEAT || — || align=right | 2.4 km || 
|-id=161 bgcolor=#E9E9E9
| 253161 ||  || — || November 13, 2002 || Palomar || NEAT || — || align=right | 1.0 km || 
|-id=162 bgcolor=#fefefe
| 253162 ||  || — || November 11, 2002 || Socorro || LINEAR || H || align=right data-sort-value="0.95" | 950 m || 
|-id=163 bgcolor=#E9E9E9
| 253163 ||  || — || November 4, 2002 || Palomar || NEAT || — || align=right data-sort-value="0.90" | 900 m || 
|-id=164 bgcolor=#E9E9E9
| 253164 || 2002 WV || — || November 21, 2002 || Palomar || NEAT || — || align=right | 2.3 km || 
|-id=165 bgcolor=#E9E9E9
| 253165 ||  || — || November 28, 2002 || Anderson Mesa || LONEOS || — || align=right | 2.0 km || 
|-id=166 bgcolor=#E9E9E9
| 253166 ||  || — || November 28, 2002 || Anderson Mesa || LONEOS || RAF || align=right | 1.2 km || 
|-id=167 bgcolor=#E9E9E9
| 253167 ||  || — || November 28, 2002 || Anderson Mesa || LONEOS || — || align=right | 1.8 km || 
|-id=168 bgcolor=#E9E9E9
| 253168 ||  || — || November 28, 2002 || Haleakala || NEAT || — || align=right | 1.8 km || 
|-id=169 bgcolor=#E9E9E9
| 253169 ||  || — || November 30, 2002 || Socorro || LINEAR || — || align=right | 1.8 km || 
|-id=170 bgcolor=#E9E9E9
| 253170 ||  || — || November 25, 2002 || Palomar || S. F. Hönig || — || align=right | 1.2 km || 
|-id=171 bgcolor=#E9E9E9
| 253171 ||  || — || November 16, 2002 || Palomar || NEAT || — || align=right | 1.7 km || 
|-id=172 bgcolor=#E9E9E9
| 253172 ||  || — || November 25, 2002 || Palomar || NEAT || — || align=right | 1.8 km || 
|-id=173 bgcolor=#E9E9E9
| 253173 ||  || — || November 16, 2002 || Palomar || NEAT || — || align=right | 1.1 km || 
|-id=174 bgcolor=#E9E9E9
| 253174 ||  || — || December 1, 2002 || Socorro || LINEAR || MAR || align=right | 1.9 km || 
|-id=175 bgcolor=#E9E9E9
| 253175 ||  || — || December 1, 2002 || Socorro || LINEAR || — || align=right | 1.0 km || 
|-id=176 bgcolor=#E9E9E9
| 253176 ||  || — || December 1, 2002 || Socorro || LINEAR || — || align=right | 1.5 km || 
|-id=177 bgcolor=#E9E9E9
| 253177 ||  || — || December 2, 2002 || Socorro || LINEAR || — || align=right | 1.6 km || 
|-id=178 bgcolor=#E9E9E9
| 253178 ||  || — || December 2, 2002 || Socorro || LINEAR || — || align=right | 2.5 km || 
|-id=179 bgcolor=#E9E9E9
| 253179 ||  || — || December 3, 2002 || Palomar || NEAT || — || align=right | 2.0 km || 
|-id=180 bgcolor=#E9E9E9
| 253180 ||  || — || December 3, 2002 || Haleakala || NEAT || — || align=right | 1.4 km || 
|-id=181 bgcolor=#E9E9E9
| 253181 ||  || — || December 3, 2002 || Palomar || NEAT || — || align=right | 1.8 km || 
|-id=182 bgcolor=#E9E9E9
| 253182 ||  || — || December 3, 2002 || Palomar || NEAT || — || align=right | 2.4 km || 
|-id=183 bgcolor=#E9E9E9
| 253183 ||  || — || December 5, 2002 || Socorro || LINEAR || ADE || align=right | 3.8 km || 
|-id=184 bgcolor=#E9E9E9
| 253184 ||  || — || December 5, 2002 || Socorro || LINEAR || — || align=right | 1.5 km || 
|-id=185 bgcolor=#E9E9E9
| 253185 ||  || — || December 3, 2002 || Palomar || NEAT || RAF || align=right | 1.4 km || 
|-id=186 bgcolor=#E9E9E9
| 253186 ||  || — || December 5, 2002 || Socorro || LINEAR || EUN || align=right | 1.6 km || 
|-id=187 bgcolor=#E9E9E9
| 253187 ||  || — || December 5, 2002 || Socorro || LINEAR || — || align=right | 1.7 km || 
|-id=188 bgcolor=#E9E9E9
| 253188 ||  || — || December 3, 2002 || Palomar || NEAT || — || align=right | 1.4 km || 
|-id=189 bgcolor=#E9E9E9
| 253189 ||  || — || December 5, 2002 || Socorro || LINEAR || — || align=right | 2.9 km || 
|-id=190 bgcolor=#E9E9E9
| 253190 ||  || — || December 6, 2002 || Socorro || LINEAR || JUN || align=right | 1.7 km || 
|-id=191 bgcolor=#E9E9E9
| 253191 ||  || — || December 6, 2002 || Socorro || LINEAR || — || align=right | 2.0 km || 
|-id=192 bgcolor=#fefefe
| 253192 ||  || — || December 10, 2002 || Socorro || LINEAR || H || align=right data-sort-value="0.84" | 840 m || 
|-id=193 bgcolor=#fefefe
| 253193 ||  || — || December 10, 2002 || Socorro || LINEAR || H || align=right data-sort-value="0.95" | 950 m || 
|-id=194 bgcolor=#fefefe
| 253194 ||  || — || December 10, 2002 || Socorro || LINEAR || NYS || align=right | 1.1 km || 
|-id=195 bgcolor=#fefefe
| 253195 ||  || — || December 10, 2002 || Palomar || NEAT || V || align=right data-sort-value="0.99" | 990 m || 
|-id=196 bgcolor=#E9E9E9
| 253196 ||  || — || December 10, 2002 || Palomar || NEAT || GAL || align=right | 3.1 km || 
|-id=197 bgcolor=#E9E9E9
| 253197 ||  || — || December 10, 2002 || Palomar || NEAT || — || align=right | 1.5 km || 
|-id=198 bgcolor=#E9E9E9
| 253198 ||  || — || December 10, 2002 || Socorro || LINEAR || slow || align=right | 3.1 km || 
|-id=199 bgcolor=#fefefe
| 253199 ||  || — || December 12, 2002 || Socorro || LINEAR || H || align=right data-sort-value="0.94" | 940 m || 
|-id=200 bgcolor=#E9E9E9
| 253200 ||  || — || December 5, 2002 || Socorro || LINEAR || — || align=right | 1.5 km || 
|}

253201–253300 

|-bgcolor=#E9E9E9
| 253201 ||  || — || December 10, 2002 || Socorro || LINEAR || — || align=right | 1.8 km || 
|-id=202 bgcolor=#E9E9E9
| 253202 ||  || — || December 11, 2002 || Socorro || LINEAR || — || align=right | 1.4 km || 
|-id=203 bgcolor=#E9E9E9
| 253203 ||  || — || December 11, 2002 || Socorro || LINEAR || — || align=right | 1.7 km || 
|-id=204 bgcolor=#E9E9E9
| 253204 ||  || — || December 11, 2002 || Socorro || LINEAR || — || align=right | 1.6 km || 
|-id=205 bgcolor=#E9E9E9
| 253205 ||  || — || December 11, 2002 || Socorro || LINEAR || — || align=right | 2.2 km || 
|-id=206 bgcolor=#E9E9E9
| 253206 ||  || — || December 11, 2002 || Socorro || LINEAR || EUN || align=right | 1.9 km || 
|-id=207 bgcolor=#E9E9E9
| 253207 ||  || — || December 11, 2002 || Socorro || LINEAR || — || align=right | 2.5 km || 
|-id=208 bgcolor=#E9E9E9
| 253208 ||  || — || December 12, 2002 || Palomar || NEAT || — || align=right | 1.5 km || 
|-id=209 bgcolor=#E9E9E9
| 253209 ||  || — || December 11, 2002 || Socorro || LINEAR || — || align=right | 1.8 km || 
|-id=210 bgcolor=#E9E9E9
| 253210 ||  || — || December 10, 2002 || Bergisch Gladbach || W. Bickel || — || align=right | 1.3 km || 
|-id=211 bgcolor=#E9E9E9
| 253211 ||  || — || December 5, 2002 || Socorro || LINEAR || — || align=right data-sort-value="0.98" | 980 m || 
|-id=212 bgcolor=#E9E9E9
| 253212 ||  || — || December 5, 2002 || Socorro || LINEAR || — || align=right | 1.5 km || 
|-id=213 bgcolor=#E9E9E9
| 253213 ||  || — || December 5, 2002 || Socorro || LINEAR || — || align=right | 3.5 km || 
|-id=214 bgcolor=#E9E9E9
| 253214 ||  || — || December 5, 2002 || Socorro || LINEAR || — || align=right | 1.4 km || 
|-id=215 bgcolor=#E9E9E9
| 253215 ||  || — || December 6, 2002 || Socorro || LINEAR || — || align=right | 1.4 km || 
|-id=216 bgcolor=#E9E9E9
| 253216 ||  || — || December 10, 2002 || Socorro || LINEAR || — || align=right | 2.3 km || 
|-id=217 bgcolor=#E9E9E9
| 253217 ||  || — || December 5, 2002 || Palomar || NEAT || — || align=right | 1.1 km || 
|-id=218 bgcolor=#E9E9E9
| 253218 ||  || — || December 5, 2002 || Socorro || LINEAR || — || align=right | 3.0 km || 
|-id=219 bgcolor=#E9E9E9
| 253219 ||  || — || December 14, 2002 || Apache Point || SDSS || — || align=right | 3.4 km || 
|-id=220 bgcolor=#E9E9E9
| 253220 ||  || — || December 27, 2002 || Socorro || LINEAR || — || align=right | 4.5 km || 
|-id=221 bgcolor=#E9E9E9
| 253221 ||  || — || December 28, 2002 || Pla D'Arguines || Pla D'Arguines Obs. || — || align=right | 2.2 km || 
|-id=222 bgcolor=#E9E9E9
| 253222 ||  || — || December 28, 2002 || Socorro || LINEAR || — || align=right | 2.2 km || 
|-id=223 bgcolor=#E9E9E9
| 253223 ||  || — || December 27, 2002 || Anderson Mesa || LONEOS || — || align=right | 1.7 km || 
|-id=224 bgcolor=#E9E9E9
| 253224 ||  || — || December 28, 2002 || Needville || Needville Obs. || — || align=right | 1.9 km || 
|-id=225 bgcolor=#E9E9E9
| 253225 ||  || — || December 31, 2002 || Socorro || LINEAR || RAF || align=right | 1.3 km || 
|-id=226 bgcolor=#fefefe
| 253226 ||  || — || December 31, 2002 || Socorro || LINEAR || — || align=right | 1.7 km || 
|-id=227 bgcolor=#E9E9E9
| 253227 ||  || — || December 31, 2002 || Socorro || LINEAR || — || align=right | 2.9 km || 
|-id=228 bgcolor=#E9E9E9
| 253228 ||  || — || December 31, 2002 || Socorro || LINEAR || — || align=right | 1.6 km || 
|-id=229 bgcolor=#E9E9E9
| 253229 ||  || — || December 31, 2002 || Socorro || LINEAR || — || align=right | 2.2 km || 
|-id=230 bgcolor=#E9E9E9
| 253230 ||  || — || December 31, 2002 || Socorro || LINEAR || — || align=right | 1.1 km || 
|-id=231 bgcolor=#E9E9E9
| 253231 ||  || — || December 31, 2002 || Socorro || LINEAR || GEF || align=right | 2.0 km || 
|-id=232 bgcolor=#E9E9E9
| 253232 ||  || — || December 31, 2002 || Socorro || LINEAR || — || align=right | 1.3 km || 
|-id=233 bgcolor=#E9E9E9
| 253233 ||  || — || December 31, 2002 || Socorro || LINEAR || — || align=right | 1.4 km || 
|-id=234 bgcolor=#E9E9E9
| 253234 ||  || — || December 31, 2002 || Socorro || LINEAR || — || align=right | 1.9 km || 
|-id=235 bgcolor=#E9E9E9
| 253235 ||  || — || December 31, 2002 || Socorro || LINEAR || — || align=right | 2.5 km || 
|-id=236 bgcolor=#E9E9E9
| 253236 ||  || — || January 2, 2003 || Socorro || LINEAR || — || align=right | 2.1 km || 
|-id=237 bgcolor=#E9E9E9
| 253237 ||  || — || January 2, 2003 || Anderson Mesa || LONEOS || IAN || align=right | 1.5 km || 
|-id=238 bgcolor=#E9E9E9
| 253238 ||  || — || January 2, 2003 || Socorro || LINEAR || — || align=right | 2.4 km || 
|-id=239 bgcolor=#E9E9E9
| 253239 ||  || — || January 2, 2003 || Socorro || LINEAR || — || align=right | 3.5 km || 
|-id=240 bgcolor=#E9E9E9
| 253240 ||  || — || January 5, 2003 || Anderson Mesa || LONEOS || — || align=right | 2.5 km || 
|-id=241 bgcolor=#E9E9E9
| 253241 ||  || — || January 5, 2003 || Anderson Mesa || LONEOS || — || align=right | 2.4 km || 
|-id=242 bgcolor=#E9E9E9
| 253242 ||  || — || January 5, 2003 || Socorro || LINEAR || WIT || align=right | 1.3 km || 
|-id=243 bgcolor=#E9E9E9
| 253243 ||  || — || January 5, 2003 || Socorro || LINEAR || — || align=right | 1.4 km || 
|-id=244 bgcolor=#E9E9E9
| 253244 ||  || — || January 4, 2003 || Socorro || LINEAR || — || align=right | 1.5 km || 
|-id=245 bgcolor=#E9E9E9
| 253245 ||  || — || January 4, 2003 || Socorro || LINEAR || — || align=right | 1.6 km || 
|-id=246 bgcolor=#E9E9E9
| 253246 ||  || — || January 4, 2003 || Socorro || LINEAR || BRU || align=right | 5.5 km || 
|-id=247 bgcolor=#E9E9E9
| 253247 ||  || — || January 5, 2003 || Anderson Mesa || LONEOS || — || align=right | 2.6 km || 
|-id=248 bgcolor=#E9E9E9
| 253248 ||  || — || January 7, 2003 || Socorro || LINEAR || — || align=right | 1.5 km || 
|-id=249 bgcolor=#E9E9E9
| 253249 ||  || — || January 7, 2003 || Socorro || LINEAR || — || align=right | 1.9 km || 
|-id=250 bgcolor=#E9E9E9
| 253250 ||  || — || January 5, 2003 || Socorro || LINEAR || RAF || align=right | 1.4 km || 
|-id=251 bgcolor=#E9E9E9
| 253251 ||  || — || January 5, 2003 || Socorro || LINEAR || — || align=right | 2.1 km || 
|-id=252 bgcolor=#E9E9E9
| 253252 ||  || — || January 5, 2003 || Socorro || LINEAR || — || align=right | 1.3 km || 
|-id=253 bgcolor=#E9E9E9
| 253253 ||  || — || January 5, 2003 || Socorro || LINEAR || — || align=right | 1.7 km || 
|-id=254 bgcolor=#E9E9E9
| 253254 ||  || — || January 5, 2003 || Socorro || LINEAR || — || align=right | 1.8 km || 
|-id=255 bgcolor=#E9E9E9
| 253255 ||  || — || January 5, 2003 || Socorro || LINEAR || — || align=right | 2.4 km || 
|-id=256 bgcolor=#E9E9E9
| 253256 ||  || — || January 5, 2003 || Socorro || LINEAR || — || align=right | 2.0 km || 
|-id=257 bgcolor=#E9E9E9
| 253257 ||  || — || January 5, 2003 || Socorro || LINEAR || — || align=right | 1.5 km || 
|-id=258 bgcolor=#E9E9E9
| 253258 ||  || — || January 5, 2003 || Socorro || LINEAR || — || align=right | 2.1 km || 
|-id=259 bgcolor=#E9E9E9
| 253259 ||  || — || January 5, 2003 || Socorro || LINEAR || — || align=right | 1.9 km || 
|-id=260 bgcolor=#E9E9E9
| 253260 ||  || — || January 5, 2003 || Socorro || LINEAR || — || align=right | 1.8 km || 
|-id=261 bgcolor=#E9E9E9
| 253261 ||  || — || January 5, 2003 || Socorro || LINEAR || — || align=right | 3.1 km || 
|-id=262 bgcolor=#E9E9E9
| 253262 ||  || — || January 5, 2003 || Socorro || LINEAR || — || align=right | 2.2 km || 
|-id=263 bgcolor=#E9E9E9
| 253263 ||  || — || January 7, 2003 || Socorro || LINEAR || — || align=right | 1.2 km || 
|-id=264 bgcolor=#E9E9E9
| 253264 ||  || — || January 8, 2003 || Socorro || LINEAR || — || align=right | 2.2 km || 
|-id=265 bgcolor=#E9E9E9
| 253265 ||  || — || January 7, 2003 || Socorro || LINEAR || — || align=right | 1.7 km || 
|-id=266 bgcolor=#E9E9E9
| 253266 ||  || — || January 7, 2003 || Socorro || LINEAR || — || align=right | 3.1 km || 
|-id=267 bgcolor=#E9E9E9
| 253267 ||  || — || January 9, 2003 || Socorro || LINEAR || RAF || align=right | 1.1 km || 
|-id=268 bgcolor=#fefefe
| 253268 ||  || — || January 9, 2003 || Socorro || LINEAR || H || align=right data-sort-value="0.83" | 830 m || 
|-id=269 bgcolor=#E9E9E9
| 253269 ||  || — || January 10, 2003 || Socorro || LINEAR || — || align=right | 3.4 km || 
|-id=270 bgcolor=#E9E9E9
| 253270 ||  || — || January 10, 2003 || Socorro || LINEAR || — || align=right | 3.5 km || 
|-id=271 bgcolor=#E9E9E9
| 253271 ||  || — || January 10, 2003 || Socorro || LINEAR || EUN || align=right | 1.8 km || 
|-id=272 bgcolor=#E9E9E9
| 253272 ||  || — || January 10, 2003 || Socorro || LINEAR || — || align=right | 2.5 km || 
|-id=273 bgcolor=#fefefe
| 253273 ||  || — || January 10, 2003 || Socorro || LINEAR || H || align=right | 1.0 km || 
|-id=274 bgcolor=#E9E9E9
| 253274 ||  || — || January 7, 2003 || Socorro || LINEAR || — || align=right | 1.9 km || 
|-id=275 bgcolor=#E9E9E9
| 253275 ||  || — || January 11, 2003 || Socorro || LINEAR || — || align=right | 2.7 km || 
|-id=276 bgcolor=#E9E9E9
| 253276 ||  || — || January 23, 2003 || La Silla || A. Boattini, H. Scholl || — || align=right | 2.6 km || 
|-id=277 bgcolor=#d6d6d6
| 253277 ||  || — || January 25, 2003 || La Silla || A. Boattini, H. Scholl || BRA || align=right | 2.6 km || 
|-id=278 bgcolor=#E9E9E9
| 253278 ||  || — || January 26, 2003 || Palomar || NEAT || — || align=right | 1.9 km || 
|-id=279 bgcolor=#E9E9E9
| 253279 ||  || — || January 26, 2003 || Anderson Mesa || LONEOS || INO || align=right | 2.3 km || 
|-id=280 bgcolor=#E9E9E9
| 253280 ||  || — || January 26, 2003 || Anderson Mesa || LONEOS || — || align=right | 2.7 km || 
|-id=281 bgcolor=#E9E9E9
| 253281 ||  || — || January 26, 2003 || Anderson Mesa || LONEOS || — || align=right | 1.8 km || 
|-id=282 bgcolor=#E9E9E9
| 253282 ||  || — || January 25, 2003 || Palomar || NEAT || MAR || align=right | 1.8 km || 
|-id=283 bgcolor=#E9E9E9
| 253283 ||  || — || January 26, 2003 || Anderson Mesa || LONEOS || — || align=right | 2.5 km || 
|-id=284 bgcolor=#E9E9E9
| 253284 ||  || — || January 26, 2003 || Anderson Mesa || LONEOS || — || align=right | 3.1 km || 
|-id=285 bgcolor=#E9E9E9
| 253285 ||  || — || January 26, 2003 || Haleakala || NEAT || JUN || align=right | 1.6 km || 
|-id=286 bgcolor=#E9E9E9
| 253286 ||  || — || January 27, 2003 || Palomar || NEAT || — || align=right | 2.4 km || 
|-id=287 bgcolor=#E9E9E9
| 253287 ||  || — || January 27, 2003 || Socorro || LINEAR || — || align=right | 2.7 km || 
|-id=288 bgcolor=#E9E9E9
| 253288 ||  || — || January 27, 2003 || Socorro || LINEAR || AGN || align=right | 1.4 km || 
|-id=289 bgcolor=#E9E9E9
| 253289 ||  || — || January 29, 2003 || Kitt Peak || Spacewatch || — || align=right | 1.8 km || 
|-id=290 bgcolor=#E9E9E9
| 253290 ||  || — || January 27, 2003 || Haleakala || NEAT || — || align=right | 1.6 km || 
|-id=291 bgcolor=#E9E9E9
| 253291 ||  || — || January 28, 2003 || Kitt Peak || Spacewatch || — || align=right | 2.5 km || 
|-id=292 bgcolor=#E9E9E9
| 253292 ||  || — || January 28, 2003 || Palomar || NEAT || — || align=right | 2.3 km || 
|-id=293 bgcolor=#E9E9E9
| 253293 ||  || — || January 28, 2003 || Palomar || NEAT || — || align=right | 2.2 km || 
|-id=294 bgcolor=#E9E9E9
| 253294 ||  || — || January 28, 2003 || Socorro || LINEAR || — || align=right | 4.8 km || 
|-id=295 bgcolor=#E9E9E9
| 253295 ||  || — || January 28, 2003 || Palomar || NEAT || — || align=right | 1.8 km || 
|-id=296 bgcolor=#E9E9E9
| 253296 ||  || — || January 28, 2003 || Socorro || LINEAR || GEF || align=right | 1.9 km || 
|-id=297 bgcolor=#E9E9E9
| 253297 ||  || — || January 28, 2003 || Socorro || LINEAR || — || align=right | 2.0 km || 
|-id=298 bgcolor=#E9E9E9
| 253298 ||  || — || January 28, 2003 || Palomar || NEAT || — || align=right | 1.9 km || 
|-id=299 bgcolor=#E9E9E9
| 253299 ||  || — || January 29, 2003 || Palomar || NEAT || — || align=right | 1.6 km || 
|-id=300 bgcolor=#E9E9E9
| 253300 ||  || — || January 29, 2003 || Palomar || NEAT || — || align=right | 2.1 km || 
|}

253301–253400 

|-bgcolor=#E9E9E9
| 253301 ||  || — || January 31, 2003 || Anderson Mesa || LONEOS || JUN || align=right | 2.0 km || 
|-id=302 bgcolor=#E9E9E9
| 253302 ||  || — || January 28, 2003 || Haleakala || NEAT || RAF || align=right | 1.5 km || 
|-id=303 bgcolor=#E9E9E9
| 253303 ||  || — || February 1, 2003 || Socorro || LINEAR || — || align=right | 3.9 km || 
|-id=304 bgcolor=#E9E9E9
| 253304 ||  || — || February 1, 2003 || Socorro || LINEAR || MRX || align=right | 1.7 km || 
|-id=305 bgcolor=#E9E9E9
| 253305 ||  || — || February 1, 2003 || Socorro || LINEAR || EUN || align=right | 2.9 km || 
|-id=306 bgcolor=#E9E9E9
| 253306 ||  || — || February 1, 2003 || Haleakala || NEAT || — || align=right | 3.1 km || 
|-id=307 bgcolor=#E9E9E9
| 253307 ||  || — || February 2, 2003 || Palomar || NEAT || — || align=right | 3.3 km || 
|-id=308 bgcolor=#E9E9E9
| 253308 ||  || — || February 8, 2003 || Socorro || LINEAR || XIZ || align=right | 1.8 km || 
|-id=309 bgcolor=#E9E9E9
| 253309 ||  || — || February 9, 2003 || Kitt Peak || Spacewatch || — || align=right | 3.3 km || 
|-id=310 bgcolor=#E9E9E9
| 253310 ||  || — || February 9, 2003 || Palomar || NEAT || — || align=right | 3.4 km || 
|-id=311 bgcolor=#E9E9E9
| 253311 ||  || — || February 11, 2003 || La Silla || R. Michelsen, G. Masi || — || align=right | 2.7 km || 
|-id=312 bgcolor=#E9E9E9
| 253312 ||  || — || February 2, 2003 || Palomar || NEAT || — || align=right | 2.4 km || 
|-id=313 bgcolor=#E9E9E9
| 253313 ||  || — || February 21, 2003 || Palomar || NEAT || GEF || align=right | 1.8 km || 
|-id=314 bgcolor=#E9E9E9
| 253314 ||  || — || February 19, 2003 || Palomar || NEAT || — || align=right | 1.2 km || 
|-id=315 bgcolor=#E9E9E9
| 253315 ||  || — || February 19, 2003 || Palomar || NEAT || — || align=right | 3.2 km || 
|-id=316 bgcolor=#d6d6d6
| 253316 ||  || — || February 23, 2003 || Kitt Peak || Spacewatch || — || align=right | 4.3 km || 
|-id=317 bgcolor=#E9E9E9
| 253317 ||  || — || February 21, 2003 || Palomar || NEAT || — || align=right | 2.2 km || 
|-id=318 bgcolor=#E9E9E9
| 253318 ||  || — || February 23, 2003 || Anderson Mesa || LONEOS || — || align=right | 4.1 km || 
|-id=319 bgcolor=#E9E9E9
| 253319 ||  || — || February 28, 2003 || Socorro || LINEAR || — || align=right | 3.4 km || 
|-id=320 bgcolor=#E9E9E9
| 253320 ||  || — || February 28, 2003 || Socorro || LINEAR || — || align=right | 2.7 km || 
|-id=321 bgcolor=#E9E9E9
| 253321 ||  || — || March 6, 2003 || Anderson Mesa || LONEOS || — || align=right | 4.3 km || 
|-id=322 bgcolor=#E9E9E9
| 253322 ||  || — || March 6, 2003 || Palomar || NEAT || MRX || align=right | 1.4 km || 
|-id=323 bgcolor=#E9E9E9
| 253323 ||  || — || March 6, 2003 || Palomar || NEAT || — || align=right | 1.1 km || 
|-id=324 bgcolor=#E9E9E9
| 253324 ||  || — || March 6, 2003 || Anderson Mesa || LONEOS || — || align=right | 2.0 km || 
|-id=325 bgcolor=#E9E9E9
| 253325 ||  || — || March 6, 2003 || Socorro || LINEAR || — || align=right | 2.3 km || 
|-id=326 bgcolor=#E9E9E9
| 253326 ||  || — || March 7, 2003 || Anderson Mesa || LONEOS || AGN || align=right | 1.9 km || 
|-id=327 bgcolor=#E9E9E9
| 253327 ||  || — || March 8, 2003 || Kitt Peak || Spacewatch || — || align=right | 2.4 km || 
|-id=328 bgcolor=#fefefe
| 253328 ||  || — || March 10, 2003 || Socorro || LINEAR || H || align=right | 1.1 km || 
|-id=329 bgcolor=#d6d6d6
| 253329 ||  || — || March 11, 2003 || Palomar || NEAT || — || align=right | 3.4 km || 
|-id=330 bgcolor=#C2FFFF
| 253330 ||  || — || March 12, 2003 || Kitt Peak || Spacewatch || L4 || align=right | 14 km || 
|-id=331 bgcolor=#fefefe
| 253331 ||  || — || March 23, 2003 || Socorro || LINEAR || H || align=right | 1.1 km || 
|-id=332 bgcolor=#E9E9E9
| 253332 ||  || — || March 26, 2003 || Socorro || LINEAR || — || align=right | 4.6 km || 
|-id=333 bgcolor=#d6d6d6
| 253333 ||  || — || March 26, 2003 || Wrightwood || J. W. Young || CHA || align=right | 2.4 km || 
|-id=334 bgcolor=#E9E9E9
| 253334 ||  || — || March 20, 2003 || Palomar || NEAT || DOR || align=right | 3.0 km || 
|-id=335 bgcolor=#E9E9E9
| 253335 ||  || — || March 24, 2003 || Kitt Peak || Spacewatch || GEF || align=right | 2.0 km || 
|-id=336 bgcolor=#E9E9E9
| 253336 ||  || — || March 23, 2003 || Palomar || NEAT || JUN || align=right | 1.4 km || 
|-id=337 bgcolor=#d6d6d6
| 253337 ||  || — || March 23, 2003 || Kitt Peak || Spacewatch || — || align=right | 4.2 km || 
|-id=338 bgcolor=#d6d6d6
| 253338 ||  || — || March 23, 2003 || Kitt Peak || Spacewatch || TIR || align=right | 3.4 km || 
|-id=339 bgcolor=#d6d6d6
| 253339 ||  || — || March 23, 2003 || Kitt Peak || Spacewatch || 628 || align=right | 2.2 km || 
|-id=340 bgcolor=#C2FFFF
| 253340 ||  || — || March 24, 2003 || Kitt Peak || Spacewatch || L4 || align=right | 11 km || 
|-id=341 bgcolor=#d6d6d6
| 253341 ||  || — || March 23, 2003 || Kitt Peak || Spacewatch || — || align=right | 4.3 km || 
|-id=342 bgcolor=#d6d6d6
| 253342 ||  || — || March 24, 2003 || Kitt Peak || Spacewatch || — || align=right | 4.0 km || 
|-id=343 bgcolor=#C2FFFF
| 253343 ||  || — || March 24, 2003 || Kitt Peak || Spacewatch || L4 || align=right | 10 km || 
|-id=344 bgcolor=#E9E9E9
| 253344 ||  || — || March 25, 2003 || Palomar || NEAT || — || align=right | 3.7 km || 
|-id=345 bgcolor=#d6d6d6
| 253345 ||  || — || March 25, 2003 || Haleakala || NEAT || — || align=right | 3.6 km || 
|-id=346 bgcolor=#E9E9E9
| 253346 ||  || — || March 26, 2003 || Palomar || NEAT || — || align=right | 3.7 km || 
|-id=347 bgcolor=#C2FFFF
| 253347 ||  || — || March 26, 2003 || Palomar || NEAT || L4 || align=right | 14 km || 
|-id=348 bgcolor=#C2FFFF
| 253348 ||  || — || March 26, 2003 || Kitt Peak || Spacewatch || L4 || align=right | 14 km || 
|-id=349 bgcolor=#E9E9E9
| 253349 ||  || — || March 27, 2003 || Palomar || NEAT || — || align=right | 3.2 km || 
|-id=350 bgcolor=#d6d6d6
| 253350 ||  || — || March 27, 2003 || Palomar || NEAT || — || align=right | 4.5 km || 
|-id=351 bgcolor=#E9E9E9
| 253351 ||  || — || March 27, 2003 || Kitt Peak || Spacewatch || — || align=right | 3.2 km || 
|-id=352 bgcolor=#E9E9E9
| 253352 ||  || — || March 27, 2003 || Socorro || LINEAR || — || align=right | 2.3 km || 
|-id=353 bgcolor=#E9E9E9
| 253353 ||  || — || March 27, 2003 || Kitt Peak || Spacewatch || GAL || align=right | 2.5 km || 
|-id=354 bgcolor=#E9E9E9
| 253354 ||  || — || March 31, 2003 || Kitt Peak || Spacewatch || — || align=right | 3.5 km || 
|-id=355 bgcolor=#d6d6d6
| 253355 ||  || — || March 26, 2003 || Kitt Peak || Spacewatch || — || align=right | 3.6 km || 
|-id=356 bgcolor=#C2FFFF
| 253356 ||  || — || March 24, 2003 || Kitt Peak || Spacewatch || L4 || align=right | 10 km || 
|-id=357 bgcolor=#C2FFFF
| 253357 ||  || — || March 27, 2003 || Kitt Peak || Spacewatch || L4 || align=right | 9.1 km || 
|-id=358 bgcolor=#d6d6d6
| 253358 ||  || — || April 1, 2003 || Socorro || LINEAR || — || align=right | 5.3 km || 
|-id=359 bgcolor=#fefefe
| 253359 ||  || — || April 1, 2003 || Socorro || LINEAR || — || align=right data-sort-value="0.91" | 910 m || 
|-id=360 bgcolor=#d6d6d6
| 253360 ||  || — || April 4, 2003 || Kitt Peak || Spacewatch || — || align=right | 3.6 km || 
|-id=361 bgcolor=#E9E9E9
| 253361 ||  || — || April 3, 2003 || Anderson Mesa || LONEOS || — || align=right | 3.3 km || 
|-id=362 bgcolor=#C2FFFF
| 253362 ||  || — || April 7, 2003 || Kitt Peak || Spacewatch || L4 || align=right | 12 km || 
|-id=363 bgcolor=#E9E9E9
| 253363 ||  || — || April 4, 2003 || Kitt Peak || Spacewatch || AGN || align=right | 1.6 km || 
|-id=364 bgcolor=#C2FFFF
| 253364 ||  || — || April 7, 2003 || Kitt Peak || Spacewatch || L4 || align=right | 10 km || 
|-id=365 bgcolor=#d6d6d6
| 253365 ||  || — || April 8, 2003 || Kitt Peak || Spacewatch || CHA || align=right | 2.6 km || 
|-id=366 bgcolor=#E9E9E9
| 253366 ||  || — || April 8, 2003 || Reedy Creek || J. Broughton || — || align=right | 3.1 km || 
|-id=367 bgcolor=#E9E9E9
| 253367 ||  || — || April 7, 2003 || Socorro || LINEAR || — || align=right | 3.2 km || 
|-id=368 bgcolor=#E9E9E9
| 253368 ||  || — || April 9, 2003 || Palomar || NEAT || EUN || align=right | 1.7 km || 
|-id=369 bgcolor=#E9E9E9
| 253369 ||  || — || April 1, 2003 || Anderson Mesa || LONEOS || — || align=right | 3.0 km || 
|-id=370 bgcolor=#E9E9E9
| 253370 ||  || — || April 24, 2003 || Kitt Peak || Spacewatch || — || align=right | 2.3 km || 
|-id=371 bgcolor=#d6d6d6
| 253371 ||  || — || April 26, 2003 || Campo Imperatore || CINEOS || — || align=right | 4.5 km || 
|-id=372 bgcolor=#d6d6d6
| 253372 ||  || — || April 26, 2003 || Socorro || LINEAR || THB || align=right | 3.8 km || 
|-id=373 bgcolor=#d6d6d6
| 253373 ||  || — || April 24, 2003 || Kitt Peak || Spacewatch || — || align=right | 4.2 km || 
|-id=374 bgcolor=#E9E9E9
| 253374 ||  || — || April 26, 2003 || Kitt Peak || Spacewatch || — || align=right | 2.7 km || 
|-id=375 bgcolor=#d6d6d6
| 253375 ||  || — || April 25, 2003 || Anderson Mesa || LONEOS || EOS || align=right | 2.9 km || 
|-id=376 bgcolor=#E9E9E9
| 253376 ||  || — || April 26, 2003 || Kitt Peak || Spacewatch || DOR || align=right | 3.3 km || 
|-id=377 bgcolor=#C2FFFF
| 253377 ||  || — || April 29, 2003 || Kitt Peak || Spacewatch || L4 || align=right | 12 km || 
|-id=378 bgcolor=#d6d6d6
| 253378 ||  || — || April 25, 2003 || Campo Imperatore || CINEOS || — || align=right | 3.5 km || 
|-id=379 bgcolor=#d6d6d6
| 253379 ||  || — || April 28, 2003 || Anderson Mesa || LONEOS || — || align=right | 5.3 km || 
|-id=380 bgcolor=#C2FFFF
| 253380 ||  || — || April 30, 2003 || Kitt Peak || Spacewatch || L4 || align=right | 14 km || 
|-id=381 bgcolor=#d6d6d6
| 253381 ||  || — || May 1, 2003 || Socorro || LINEAR || TIR || align=right | 4.6 km || 
|-id=382 bgcolor=#C2FFFF
| 253382 ||  || — || May 2, 2003 || Socorro || LINEAR || L4HEK || align=right | 19 km || 
|-id=383 bgcolor=#d6d6d6
| 253383 || 2003 KA || — || May 20, 2003 || Wrightwood || J. W. Young || EOS || align=right | 2.1 km || 
|-id=384 bgcolor=#fefefe
| 253384 ||  || — || May 22, 2003 || Reedy Creek || J. Broughton || fast? || align=right | 1.0 km || 
|-id=385 bgcolor=#d6d6d6
| 253385 ||  || — || May 22, 2003 || Kitt Peak || Spacewatch || — || align=right | 3.5 km || 
|-id=386 bgcolor=#d6d6d6
| 253386 ||  || — || May 27, 2003 || Kitt Peak || Spacewatch || EOS || align=right | 2.5 km || 
|-id=387 bgcolor=#FA8072
| 253387 ||  || — || May 25, 2003 || Haleakala || NEAT || — || align=right | 1.2 km || 
|-id=388 bgcolor=#fefefe
| 253388 ||  || — || May 29, 2003 || Kitt Peak || Spacewatch || — || align=right data-sort-value="0.87" | 870 m || 
|-id=389 bgcolor=#d6d6d6
| 253389 ||  || — || May 31, 2003 || Cerro Tololo || M. W. Buie || — || align=right | 2.6 km || 
|-id=390 bgcolor=#d6d6d6
| 253390 ||  || — || May 27, 2003 || Kitt Peak || Spacewatch || fast? || align=right | 4.9 km || 
|-id=391 bgcolor=#d6d6d6
| 253391 ||  || — || June 2, 2003 || Socorro || LINEAR || — || align=right | 4.5 km || 
|-id=392 bgcolor=#fefefe
| 253392 || 2003 MY || — || June 23, 2003 || Socorro || LINEAR || — || align=right | 1.4 km || 
|-id=393 bgcolor=#fefefe
| 253393 ||  || — || June 26, 2003 || Socorro || LINEAR || — || align=right | 1.1 km || 
|-id=394 bgcolor=#fefefe
| 253394 ||  || — || July 7, 2003 || Kitt Peak || Spacewatch || FLO || align=right | 1.1 km || 
|-id=395 bgcolor=#fefefe
| 253395 ||  || — || July 7, 2003 || Kitt Peak || Spacewatch || — || align=right data-sort-value="0.94" | 940 m || 
|-id=396 bgcolor=#d6d6d6
| 253396 ||  || — || July 22, 2003 || Campo Imperatore || CINEOS || — || align=right | 8.1 km || 
|-id=397 bgcolor=#fefefe
| 253397 ||  || — || July 26, 2003 || Reedy Creek || J. Broughton || — || align=right | 1.1 km || 
|-id=398 bgcolor=#d6d6d6
| 253398 ||  || — || July 30, 2003 || Campo Imperatore || CINEOS || HYG || align=right | 4.4 km || 
|-id=399 bgcolor=#fefefe
| 253399 ||  || — || July 24, 2003 || Palomar || NEAT || — || align=right data-sort-value="0.99" | 990 m || 
|-id=400 bgcolor=#fefefe
| 253400 ||  || — || July 24, 2003 || Palomar || NEAT || — || align=right | 1.1 km || 
|}

253401–253500 

|-bgcolor=#fefefe
| 253401 ||  || — || August 2, 2003 || Haleakala || NEAT || — || align=right data-sort-value="0.93" | 930 m || 
|-id=402 bgcolor=#fefefe
| 253402 ||  || — || August 2, 2003 || Haleakala || NEAT || — || align=right | 1.2 km || 
|-id=403 bgcolor=#fefefe
| 253403 ||  || — || August 4, 2003 || Socorro || LINEAR || — || align=right data-sort-value="0.99" | 990 m || 
|-id=404 bgcolor=#fefefe
| 253404 ||  || — || August 1, 2003 || Haleakala || NEAT || FLO || align=right | 1.1 km || 
|-id=405 bgcolor=#fefefe
| 253405 || 2003 QE || — || August 18, 2003 || Campo Imperatore || CINEOS || FLO || align=right data-sort-value="0.76" | 760 m || 
|-id=406 bgcolor=#fefefe
| 253406 ||  || — || August 18, 2003 || Haleakala || NEAT || — || align=right | 1.8 km || 
|-id=407 bgcolor=#fefefe
| 253407 ||  || — || August 20, 2003 || Reedy Creek || J. Broughton || — || align=right | 1.2 km || 
|-id=408 bgcolor=#fefefe
| 253408 ||  || — || August 20, 2003 || Palomar || NEAT || — || align=right data-sort-value="0.97" | 970 m || 
|-id=409 bgcolor=#fefefe
| 253409 ||  || — || August 20, 2003 || Palomar || NEAT || V || align=right data-sort-value="0.82" | 820 m || 
|-id=410 bgcolor=#fefefe
| 253410 ||  || — || August 22, 2003 || Palomar || NEAT || FLO || align=right data-sort-value="0.92" | 920 m || 
|-id=411 bgcolor=#fefefe
| 253411 ||  || — || August 22, 2003 || Palomar || NEAT || — || align=right | 1.2 km || 
|-id=412 bgcolor=#fefefe
| 253412 Ráskaylea ||  ||  || August 23, 2003 || Piszkéstető || K. Sárneczky, B. Sipőcz || — || align=right | 1.4 km || 
|-id=413 bgcolor=#fefefe
| 253413 ||  || — || August 22, 2003 || Reedy Creek || J. Broughton || — || align=right | 1.0 km || 
|-id=414 bgcolor=#fefefe
| 253414 ||  || — || August 22, 2003 || Palomar || NEAT || — || align=right data-sort-value="0.93" | 930 m || 
|-id=415 bgcolor=#fefefe
| 253415 ||  || — || August 22, 2003 || Palomar || NEAT || — || align=right data-sort-value="0.84" | 840 m || 
|-id=416 bgcolor=#fefefe
| 253416 ||  || — || August 22, 2003 || Palomar || NEAT || — || align=right data-sort-value="0.91" | 910 m || 
|-id=417 bgcolor=#fefefe
| 253417 ||  || — || August 22, 2003 || Socorro || LINEAR || — || align=right data-sort-value="0.89" | 890 m || 
|-id=418 bgcolor=#fefefe
| 253418 ||  || — || August 22, 2003 || Socorro || LINEAR || — || align=right | 1.00 km || 
|-id=419 bgcolor=#fefefe
| 253419 ||  || — || August 22, 2003 || Socorro || LINEAR || — || align=right data-sort-value="0.85" | 850 m || 
|-id=420 bgcolor=#fefefe
| 253420 ||  || — || August 22, 2003 || Haleakala || NEAT || — || align=right | 1.3 km || 
|-id=421 bgcolor=#fefefe
| 253421 ||  || — || August 23, 2003 || Palomar || NEAT || — || align=right data-sort-value="0.92" | 920 m || 
|-id=422 bgcolor=#fefefe
| 253422 ||  || — || August 23, 2003 || Palomar || NEAT || NYS || align=right data-sort-value="0.88" | 880 m || 
|-id=423 bgcolor=#fefefe
| 253423 ||  || — || August 22, 2003 || Palomar || NEAT || — || align=right data-sort-value="0.98" | 980 m || 
|-id=424 bgcolor=#fefefe
| 253424 ||  || — || August 22, 2003 || Socorro || LINEAR || — || align=right | 1.0 km || 
|-id=425 bgcolor=#fefefe
| 253425 ||  || — || August 23, 2003 || Socorro || LINEAR || — || align=right data-sort-value="0.83" | 830 m || 
|-id=426 bgcolor=#fefefe
| 253426 ||  || — || August 23, 2003 || Socorro || LINEAR || — || align=right | 1.2 km || 
|-id=427 bgcolor=#fefefe
| 253427 ||  || — || August 23, 2003 || Socorro || LINEAR || V || align=right | 1.1 km || 
|-id=428 bgcolor=#fefefe
| 253428 ||  || — || August 23, 2003 || Socorro || LINEAR || — || align=right | 2.4 km || 
|-id=429 bgcolor=#fefefe
| 253429 ||  || — || August 23, 2003 || Socorro || LINEAR || — || align=right | 1.1 km || 
|-id=430 bgcolor=#fefefe
| 253430 ||  || — || August 23, 2003 || Socorro || LINEAR || — || align=right | 1.3 km || 
|-id=431 bgcolor=#fefefe
| 253431 ||  || — || August 23, 2003 || Socorro || LINEAR || ERI || align=right | 2.4 km || 
|-id=432 bgcolor=#fefefe
| 253432 ||  || — || August 23, 2003 || Socorro || LINEAR || — || align=right | 2.0 km || 
|-id=433 bgcolor=#fefefe
| 253433 ||  || — || August 24, 2003 || Socorro || LINEAR || — || align=right | 1.2 km || 
|-id=434 bgcolor=#fefefe
| 253434 ||  || — || August 25, 2003 || Socorro || LINEAR || — || align=right | 1.0 km || 
|-id=435 bgcolor=#fefefe
| 253435 ||  || — || August 30, 2003 || Haleakala || NEAT || FLO || align=right data-sort-value="0.80" | 800 m || 
|-id=436 bgcolor=#fefefe
| 253436 ||  || — || August 31, 2003 || Socorro || LINEAR || FLO || align=right data-sort-value="0.72" | 720 m || 
|-id=437 bgcolor=#fefefe
| 253437 ||  || — || August 30, 2003 || Haleakala || NEAT || — || align=right | 1.1 km || 
|-id=438 bgcolor=#fefefe
| 253438 ||  || — || August 31, 2003 || Socorro || LINEAR || — || align=right | 1.3 km || 
|-id=439 bgcolor=#fefefe
| 253439 ||  || — || August 31, 2003 || Socorro || LINEAR || — || align=right | 1.1 km || 
|-id=440 bgcolor=#fefefe
| 253440 ||  || — || August 31, 2003 || Haleakala || NEAT || FLO || align=right data-sort-value="0.94" | 940 m || 
|-id=441 bgcolor=#fefefe
| 253441 ||  || — || August 31, 2003 || Socorro || LINEAR || V || align=right data-sort-value="0.94" | 940 m || 
|-id=442 bgcolor=#fefefe
| 253442 || 2003 RZ || — || September 1, 2003 || Socorro || LINEAR || V || align=right | 1.0 km || 
|-id=443 bgcolor=#fefefe
| 253443 ||  || — || September 1, 2003 || Socorro || LINEAR || — || align=right data-sort-value="0.85" | 850 m || 
|-id=444 bgcolor=#FA8072
| 253444 ||  || — || September 4, 2003 || Campo Imperatore || CINEOS || — || align=right data-sort-value="0.98" | 980 m || 
|-id=445 bgcolor=#fefefe
| 253445 ||  || — || September 1, 2003 || Socorro || LINEAR || — || align=right data-sort-value="0.90" | 900 m || 
|-id=446 bgcolor=#FA8072
| 253446 ||  || — || September 12, 2003 || Anderson Mesa || LONEOS || — || align=right | 1.6 km || 
|-id=447 bgcolor=#fefefe
| 253447 ||  || — || September 14, 2003 || Haleakala || NEAT || FLO || align=right data-sort-value="0.88" | 880 m || 
|-id=448 bgcolor=#fefefe
| 253448 ||  || — || September 15, 2003 || Palomar || NEAT || V || align=right data-sort-value="0.99" | 990 m || 
|-id=449 bgcolor=#FA8072
| 253449 ||  || — || September 15, 2003 || Anderson Mesa || LONEOS || — || align=right data-sort-value="0.95" | 950 m || 
|-id=450 bgcolor=#fefefe
| 253450 ||  || — || September 13, 2003 || Haleakala || NEAT || — || align=right data-sort-value="0.98" | 980 m || 
|-id=451 bgcolor=#fefefe
| 253451 ||  || — || September 14, 2003 || Palomar || NEAT || PHO || align=right | 1.7 km || 
|-id=452 bgcolor=#fefefe
| 253452 ||  || — || September 14, 2003 || Haleakala || NEAT || V || align=right | 1.1 km || 
|-id=453 bgcolor=#fefefe
| 253453 ||  || — || September 3, 2003 || Bergisch Gladbach || W. Bickel || NYS || align=right data-sort-value="0.78" | 780 m || 
|-id=454 bgcolor=#fefefe
| 253454 ||  || — || September 1, 2003 || Socorro || LINEAR || — || align=right | 1.2 km || 
|-id=455 bgcolor=#fefefe
| 253455 ||  || — || September 16, 2003 || Palomar || NEAT || — || align=right | 2.4 km || 
|-id=456 bgcolor=#fefefe
| 253456 ||  || — || September 16, 2003 || Palomar || NEAT || V || align=right data-sort-value="0.83" | 830 m || 
|-id=457 bgcolor=#fefefe
| 253457 ||  || — || September 16, 2003 || Kitt Peak || Spacewatch || FLO || align=right data-sort-value="0.91" | 910 m || 
|-id=458 bgcolor=#fefefe
| 253458 ||  || — || September 16, 2003 || Kitt Peak || Spacewatch || FLO || align=right data-sort-value="0.66" | 660 m || 
|-id=459 bgcolor=#fefefe
| 253459 ||  || — || September 16, 2003 || Kitt Peak || Spacewatch || — || align=right data-sort-value="0.85" | 850 m || 
|-id=460 bgcolor=#fefefe
| 253460 ||  || — || September 17, 2003 || Kitt Peak || Spacewatch || — || align=right | 1.2 km || 
|-id=461 bgcolor=#fefefe
| 253461 ||  || — || September 17, 2003 || Kitt Peak || Spacewatch || — || align=right data-sort-value="0.83" | 830 m || 
|-id=462 bgcolor=#fefefe
| 253462 ||  || — || September 16, 2003 || Kitt Peak || Spacewatch || FLO || align=right data-sort-value="0.81" | 810 m || 
|-id=463 bgcolor=#fefefe
| 253463 ||  || — || September 16, 2003 || Kitt Peak || Spacewatch || FLO || align=right data-sort-value="0.78" | 780 m || 
|-id=464 bgcolor=#fefefe
| 253464 ||  || — || September 16, 2003 || Kitt Peak || Spacewatch || V || align=right data-sort-value="0.84" | 840 m || 
|-id=465 bgcolor=#fefefe
| 253465 ||  || — || September 17, 2003 || Kitt Peak || Spacewatch || — || align=right | 1.1 km || 
|-id=466 bgcolor=#fefefe
| 253466 ||  || — || September 17, 2003 || Kitt Peak || Spacewatch || — || align=right data-sort-value="0.88" | 880 m || 
|-id=467 bgcolor=#fefefe
| 253467 ||  || — || September 18, 2003 || Kitt Peak || Spacewatch || FLO || align=right data-sort-value="0.99" | 990 m || 
|-id=468 bgcolor=#fefefe
| 253468 ||  || — || September 18, 2003 || Palomar || NEAT || — || align=right | 1.0 km || 
|-id=469 bgcolor=#fefefe
| 253469 ||  || — || September 18, 2003 || Socorro || LINEAR || V || align=right data-sort-value="0.91" | 910 m || 
|-id=470 bgcolor=#fefefe
| 253470 ||  || — || September 16, 2003 || Palomar || NEAT || NYS || align=right | 1.1 km || 
|-id=471 bgcolor=#fefefe
| 253471 ||  || — || September 16, 2003 || Anderson Mesa || LONEOS || FLO || align=right data-sort-value="0.75" | 750 m || 
|-id=472 bgcolor=#fefefe
| 253472 ||  || — || September 16, 2003 || Anderson Mesa || LONEOS || V || align=right | 1.1 km || 
|-id=473 bgcolor=#fefefe
| 253473 ||  || — || September 16, 2003 || Anderson Mesa || LONEOS || NYS || align=right data-sort-value="0.65" | 650 m || 
|-id=474 bgcolor=#fefefe
| 253474 ||  || — || September 16, 2003 || Anderson Mesa || LONEOS || V || align=right data-sort-value="0.89" | 890 m || 
|-id=475 bgcolor=#fefefe
| 253475 ||  || — || September 16, 2003 || Anderson Mesa || LONEOS || fast || align=right data-sort-value="0.96" | 960 m || 
|-id=476 bgcolor=#fefefe
| 253476 ||  || — || September 16, 2003 || Anderson Mesa || LONEOS || NYS || align=right data-sort-value="0.90" | 900 m || 
|-id=477 bgcolor=#d6d6d6
| 253477 ||  || — || September 17, 2003 || Kitt Peak || Spacewatch || 7:4 || align=right | 5.2 km || 
|-id=478 bgcolor=#fefefe
| 253478 ||  || — || September 18, 2003 || Socorro || LINEAR || — || align=right | 1.4 km || 
|-id=479 bgcolor=#fefefe
| 253479 ||  || — || September 16, 2003 || Kitt Peak || Spacewatch || — || align=right data-sort-value="0.85" | 850 m || 
|-id=480 bgcolor=#fefefe
| 253480 ||  || — || September 18, 2003 || Kitt Peak || Spacewatch || — || align=right | 1.2 km || 
|-id=481 bgcolor=#fefefe
| 253481 ||  || — || September 18, 2003 || Kitt Peak || Spacewatch || — || align=right | 1.3 km || 
|-id=482 bgcolor=#fefefe
| 253482 ||  || — || September 18, 2003 || Kitt Peak || Spacewatch || FLO || align=right | 1.0 km || 
|-id=483 bgcolor=#fefefe
| 253483 ||  || — || September 19, 2003 || Kitt Peak || Spacewatch || FLO || align=right data-sort-value="0.78" | 780 m || 
|-id=484 bgcolor=#fefefe
| 253484 ||  || — || September 19, 2003 || Haleakala || NEAT || V || align=right | 1.0 km || 
|-id=485 bgcolor=#fefefe
| 253485 ||  || — || September 18, 2003 || Kitt Peak || Spacewatch || — || align=right data-sort-value="0.61" | 610 m || 
|-id=486 bgcolor=#fefefe
| 253486 ||  || — || September 19, 2003 || Palomar || NEAT || — || align=right | 1.2 km || 
|-id=487 bgcolor=#fefefe
| 253487 ||  || — || September 16, 2003 || Palomar || NEAT || V || align=right data-sort-value="0.83" | 830 m || 
|-id=488 bgcolor=#fefefe
| 253488 ||  || — || September 17, 2003 || Socorro || LINEAR || — || align=right | 1.4 km || 
|-id=489 bgcolor=#fefefe
| 253489 ||  || — || September 18, 2003 || Palomar || NEAT || — || align=right | 1.1 km || 
|-id=490 bgcolor=#fefefe
| 253490 ||  || — || September 18, 2003 || Socorro || LINEAR || FLO || align=right | 1.5 km || 
|-id=491 bgcolor=#fefefe
| 253491 ||  || — || September 18, 2003 || Palomar || NEAT || — || align=right data-sort-value="0.94" | 940 m || 
|-id=492 bgcolor=#fefefe
| 253492 ||  || — || September 19, 2003 || Campo Imperatore || CINEOS || V || align=right data-sort-value="0.80" | 800 m || 
|-id=493 bgcolor=#fefefe
| 253493 ||  || — || September 19, 2003 || Palomar || NEAT || FLO || align=right | 1.1 km || 
|-id=494 bgcolor=#fefefe
| 253494 ||  || — || September 20, 2003 || Socorro || LINEAR || NYS || align=right data-sort-value="0.82" | 820 m || 
|-id=495 bgcolor=#fefefe
| 253495 ||  || — || September 20, 2003 || Palomar || NEAT || — || align=right | 1.3 km || 
|-id=496 bgcolor=#fefefe
| 253496 ||  || — || September 20, 2003 || Palomar || NEAT || FLO || align=right | 1.1 km || 
|-id=497 bgcolor=#fefefe
| 253497 ||  || — || September 20, 2003 || Palomar || NEAT || V || align=right | 1.00 km || 
|-id=498 bgcolor=#fefefe
| 253498 ||  || — || September 20, 2003 || Kitt Peak || Spacewatch || — || align=right | 1.3 km || 
|-id=499 bgcolor=#fefefe
| 253499 ||  || — || September 20, 2003 || Socorro || LINEAR || MAS || align=right | 1.1 km || 
|-id=500 bgcolor=#fefefe
| 253500 ||  || — || September 16, 2003 || Kitt Peak || Spacewatch || MAS || align=right | 1.1 km || 
|}

253501–253600 

|-bgcolor=#fefefe
| 253501 ||  || — || September 16, 2003 || Palomar || NEAT || — || align=right data-sort-value="0.81" | 810 m || 
|-id=502 bgcolor=#fefefe
| 253502 ||  || — || September 18, 2003 || Socorro || LINEAR || — || align=right data-sort-value="0.79" | 790 m || 
|-id=503 bgcolor=#fefefe
| 253503 ||  || — || September 19, 2003 || Socorro || LINEAR || — || align=right | 1.1 km || 
|-id=504 bgcolor=#fefefe
| 253504 ||  || — || September 19, 2003 || Socorro || LINEAR || FLO || align=right data-sort-value="0.76" | 760 m || 
|-id=505 bgcolor=#fefefe
| 253505 ||  || — || September 19, 2003 || Campo Imperatore || CINEOS || V || align=right data-sort-value="0.75" | 750 m || 
|-id=506 bgcolor=#fefefe
| 253506 ||  || — || September 20, 2003 || Palomar || NEAT || FLO || align=right data-sort-value="0.89" | 890 m || 
|-id=507 bgcolor=#fefefe
| 253507 ||  || — || September 20, 2003 || Socorro || LINEAR || — || align=right | 1.4 km || 
|-id=508 bgcolor=#fefefe
| 253508 ||  || — || September 20, 2003 || Palomar || NEAT || — || align=right | 1.2 km || 
|-id=509 bgcolor=#fefefe
| 253509 ||  || — || September 16, 2003 || Kitt Peak || Spacewatch || — || align=right data-sort-value="0.94" | 940 m || 
|-id=510 bgcolor=#fefefe
| 253510 ||  || — || September 17, 2003 || Socorro || LINEAR || — || align=right | 1.1 km || 
|-id=511 bgcolor=#fefefe
| 253511 ||  || — || September 17, 2003 || Socorro || LINEAR || — || align=right | 1.3 km || 
|-id=512 bgcolor=#fefefe
| 253512 ||  || — || September 17, 2003 || Socorro || LINEAR || FLO || align=right data-sort-value="0.88" | 880 m || 
|-id=513 bgcolor=#fefefe
| 253513 ||  || — || September 19, 2003 || Anderson Mesa || LONEOS || FLO || align=right data-sort-value="0.94" | 940 m || 
|-id=514 bgcolor=#fefefe
| 253514 ||  || — || September 19, 2003 || Anderson Mesa || LONEOS || — || align=right | 1.0 km || 
|-id=515 bgcolor=#d6d6d6
| 253515 ||  || — || September 22, 2003 || Kitt Peak || Spacewatch || 7:4 || align=right | 4.1 km || 
|-id=516 bgcolor=#fefefe
| 253516 ||  || — || September 21, 2003 || Socorro || LINEAR || — || align=right | 1.4 km || 
|-id=517 bgcolor=#fefefe
| 253517 ||  || — || September 18, 2003 || Socorro || LINEAR || FLO || align=right | 1.0 km || 
|-id=518 bgcolor=#fefefe
| 253518 ||  || — || September 22, 2003 || Haleakala || NEAT || FLO || align=right data-sort-value="0.84" | 840 m || 
|-id=519 bgcolor=#fefefe
| 253519 ||  || — || September 23, 2003 || Haleakala || NEAT || — || align=right data-sort-value="0.98" | 980 m || 
|-id=520 bgcolor=#fefefe
| 253520 ||  || — || September 18, 2003 || Socorro || LINEAR || FLO || align=right data-sort-value="0.93" | 930 m || 
|-id=521 bgcolor=#fefefe
| 253521 ||  || — || September 19, 2003 || Socorro || LINEAR || NYS || align=right data-sort-value="0.91" | 910 m || 
|-id=522 bgcolor=#fefefe
| 253522 ||  || — || September 20, 2003 || Anderson Mesa || LONEOS || — || align=right data-sort-value="0.95" | 950 m || 
|-id=523 bgcolor=#fefefe
| 253523 ||  || — || September 21, 2003 || Kitt Peak || Spacewatch || V || align=right data-sort-value="0.77" | 770 m || 
|-id=524 bgcolor=#fefefe
| 253524 ||  || — || September 22, 2003 || Anderson Mesa || LONEOS || FLO || align=right data-sort-value="0.77" | 770 m || 
|-id=525 bgcolor=#fefefe
| 253525 ||  || — || September 22, 2003 || Kitt Peak || Spacewatch || FLO || align=right data-sort-value="0.72" | 720 m || 
|-id=526 bgcolor=#fefefe
| 253526 ||  || — || September 22, 2003 || Socorro || LINEAR || FLO || align=right | 1.2 km || 
|-id=527 bgcolor=#fefefe
| 253527 ||  || — || September 22, 2003 || Anderson Mesa || LONEOS || V || align=right data-sort-value="0.76" | 760 m || 
|-id=528 bgcolor=#fefefe
| 253528 ||  || — || September 17, 2003 || Kitt Peak || Spacewatch || — || align=right | 1.0 km || 
|-id=529 bgcolor=#fefefe
| 253529 ||  || — || September 19, 2003 || Kitt Peak || Spacewatch || — || align=right | 1.0 km || 
|-id=530 bgcolor=#fefefe
| 253530 ||  || — || September 20, 2003 || Palomar || NEAT || V || align=right data-sort-value="0.74" | 740 m || 
|-id=531 bgcolor=#fefefe
| 253531 ||  || — || September 21, 2003 || Anderson Mesa || LONEOS || V || align=right | 1.1 km || 
|-id=532 bgcolor=#fefefe
| 253532 ||  || — || September 22, 2003 || Anderson Mesa || LONEOS || — || align=right data-sort-value="0.83" | 830 m || 
|-id=533 bgcolor=#d6d6d6
| 253533 ||  || — || September 25, 2003 || Haleakala || NEAT || 7:4 || align=right | 6.8 km || 
|-id=534 bgcolor=#fefefe
| 253534 ||  || — || September 24, 2003 || Palomar || NEAT || — || align=right | 1.1 km || 
|-id=535 bgcolor=#fefefe
| 253535 ||  || — || September 25, 2003 || Haleakala || NEAT || FLO || align=right | 1.3 km || 
|-id=536 bgcolor=#fefefe
| 253536 Tymchenko ||  ||  || September 22, 2003 || Andrushivka || Andrushivka Obs. || V || align=right data-sort-value="0.83" | 830 m || 
|-id=537 bgcolor=#fefefe
| 253537 ||  || — || September 28, 2003 || Desert Eagle || W. K. Y. Yeung || — || align=right | 1.2 km || 
|-id=538 bgcolor=#fefefe
| 253538 ||  || — || September 29, 2003 || Desert Eagle || W. K. Y. Yeung || ERI || align=right | 3.2 km || 
|-id=539 bgcolor=#fefefe
| 253539 ||  || — || September 30, 2003 || Desert Eagle || W. K. Y. Yeung || NYS || align=right data-sort-value="0.88" | 880 m || 
|-id=540 bgcolor=#fefefe
| 253540 ||  || — || September 27, 2003 || Kitt Peak || Spacewatch || — || align=right data-sort-value="0.92" | 920 m || 
|-id=541 bgcolor=#fefefe
| 253541 ||  || — || September 27, 2003 || Kitt Peak || Spacewatch || — || align=right data-sort-value="0.99" | 990 m || 
|-id=542 bgcolor=#fefefe
| 253542 ||  || — || September 25, 2003 || Palomar || NEAT || FLO || align=right | 1.4 km || 
|-id=543 bgcolor=#fefefe
| 253543 ||  || — || September 25, 2003 || Palomar || NEAT || FLO || align=right | 1.1 km || 
|-id=544 bgcolor=#fefefe
| 253544 ||  || — || September 25, 2003 || Haleakala || NEAT || — || align=right | 1.0 km || 
|-id=545 bgcolor=#fefefe
| 253545 ||  || — || September 26, 2003 || Socorro || LINEAR || NYS || align=right | 1.0 km || 
|-id=546 bgcolor=#fefefe
| 253546 ||  || — || September 26, 2003 || Socorro || LINEAR || — || align=right data-sort-value="0.96" | 960 m || 
|-id=547 bgcolor=#fefefe
| 253547 ||  || — || September 27, 2003 || Socorro || LINEAR || NYS || align=right data-sort-value="0.91" | 910 m || 
|-id=548 bgcolor=#fefefe
| 253548 ||  || — || September 28, 2003 || Socorro || LINEAR || FLO || align=right data-sort-value="0.80" | 800 m || 
|-id=549 bgcolor=#fefefe
| 253549 ||  || — || September 26, 2003 || Socorro || LINEAR || — || align=right data-sort-value="0.91" | 910 m || 
|-id=550 bgcolor=#fefefe
| 253550 ||  || — || September 26, 2003 || Socorro || LINEAR || FLO || align=right data-sort-value="0.82" | 820 m || 
|-id=551 bgcolor=#fefefe
| 253551 ||  || — || September 26, 2003 || Socorro || LINEAR || — || align=right data-sort-value="0.89" | 890 m || 
|-id=552 bgcolor=#fefefe
| 253552 ||  || — || September 26, 2003 || Socorro || LINEAR || — || align=right | 1.4 km || 
|-id=553 bgcolor=#fefefe
| 253553 ||  || — || September 27, 2003 || Kitt Peak || Spacewatch || — || align=right data-sort-value="0.68" | 680 m || 
|-id=554 bgcolor=#fefefe
| 253554 ||  || — || September 27, 2003 || Socorro || LINEAR || V || align=right data-sort-value="0.82" | 820 m || 
|-id=555 bgcolor=#fefefe
| 253555 ||  || — || September 27, 2003 || Kitt Peak || Spacewatch || — || align=right | 1.2 km || 
|-id=556 bgcolor=#fefefe
| 253556 ||  || — || September 28, 2003 || Kitt Peak || Spacewatch || NYS || align=right data-sort-value="0.76" | 760 m || 
|-id=557 bgcolor=#fefefe
| 253557 ||  || — || September 28, 2003 || Kitt Peak || Spacewatch || — || align=right data-sort-value="0.90" | 900 m || 
|-id=558 bgcolor=#fefefe
| 253558 ||  || — || September 28, 2003 || Kitt Peak || Spacewatch || V || align=right data-sort-value="0.86" | 860 m || 
|-id=559 bgcolor=#fefefe
| 253559 ||  || — || September 28, 2003 || Kitt Peak || Spacewatch || FLO || align=right data-sort-value="0.72" | 720 m || 
|-id=560 bgcolor=#fefefe
| 253560 ||  || — || September 27, 2003 || Socorro || LINEAR || — || align=right | 1.2 km || 
|-id=561 bgcolor=#fefefe
| 253561 ||  || — || September 29, 2003 || Socorro || LINEAR || NYS || align=right | 1.6 km || 
|-id=562 bgcolor=#fefefe
| 253562 ||  || — || September 29, 2003 || Kitt Peak || Spacewatch || — || align=right data-sort-value="0.86" | 860 m || 
|-id=563 bgcolor=#fefefe
| 253563 ||  || — || September 21, 2003 || Bergisch Gladbach || W. Bickel || FLO || align=right data-sort-value="0.89" | 890 m || 
|-id=564 bgcolor=#fefefe
| 253564 ||  || — || September 24, 2003 || Haleakala || NEAT || — || align=right | 1.3 km || 
|-id=565 bgcolor=#fefefe
| 253565 ||  || — || September 25, 2003 || Haleakala || NEAT || FLO || align=right | 1.2 km || 
|-id=566 bgcolor=#fefefe
| 253566 ||  || — || September 27, 2003 || Socorro || LINEAR || V || align=right data-sort-value="0.67" | 670 m || 
|-id=567 bgcolor=#fefefe
| 253567 ||  || — || September 29, 2003 || Socorro || LINEAR || — || align=right | 1.2 km || 
|-id=568 bgcolor=#fefefe
| 253568 ||  || — || September 29, 2003 || Kitt Peak || Spacewatch || — || align=right data-sort-value="0.76" | 760 m || 
|-id=569 bgcolor=#fefefe
| 253569 ||  || — || September 18, 2003 || Kitt Peak || Spacewatch || V || align=right | 2.8 km || 
|-id=570 bgcolor=#fefefe
| 253570 ||  || — || September 28, 2003 || Socorro || LINEAR || NYS || align=right data-sort-value="0.77" | 770 m || 
|-id=571 bgcolor=#fefefe
| 253571 ||  || — || September 29, 2003 || Socorro || LINEAR || NYS || align=right | 1.9 km || 
|-id=572 bgcolor=#fefefe
| 253572 ||  || — || September 17, 2003 || Palomar || NEAT || — || align=right | 1.2 km || 
|-id=573 bgcolor=#fefefe
| 253573 ||  || — || September 30, 2003 || Socorro || LINEAR || FLO || align=right | 1.3 km || 
|-id=574 bgcolor=#fefefe
| 253574 ||  || — || September 30, 2003 || Anderson Mesa || LONEOS || V || align=right | 1.0 km || 
|-id=575 bgcolor=#fefefe
| 253575 ||  || — || September 28, 2003 || Socorro || LINEAR || — || align=right | 1.1 km || 
|-id=576 bgcolor=#fefefe
| 253576 ||  || — || September 29, 2003 || Socorro || LINEAR || V || align=right data-sort-value="0.77" | 770 m || 
|-id=577 bgcolor=#fefefe
| 253577 ||  || — || September 29, 2003 || Socorro || LINEAR || — || align=right data-sort-value="0.96" | 960 m || 
|-id=578 bgcolor=#E9E9E9
| 253578 ||  || — || September 22, 2003 || Palomar || NEAT || — || align=right | 2.8 km || 
|-id=579 bgcolor=#fefefe
| 253579 ||  || — || September 18, 2003 || Kitt Peak || Spacewatch || — || align=right data-sort-value="0.82" | 820 m || 
|-id=580 bgcolor=#fefefe
| 253580 ||  || — || September 29, 2003 || Kitt Peak || Spacewatch || NYS || align=right data-sort-value="0.50" | 500 m || 
|-id=581 bgcolor=#fefefe
| 253581 ||  || — || September 22, 2003 || Anderson Mesa || LONEOS || — || align=right | 1.0 km || 
|-id=582 bgcolor=#fefefe
| 253582 ||  || — || September 28, 2003 || Apache Point || SDSS || V || align=right data-sort-value="0.62" | 620 m || 
|-id=583 bgcolor=#fefefe
| 253583 ||  || — || September 18, 2003 || Kitt Peak || Spacewatch || — || align=right data-sort-value="0.87" | 870 m || 
|-id=584 bgcolor=#fefefe
| 253584 ||  || — || September 17, 2003 || Kitt Peak || Spacewatch || — || align=right data-sort-value="0.84" | 840 m || 
|-id=585 bgcolor=#fefefe
| 253585 ||  || — || September 21, 2003 || Kitt Peak || Spacewatch || — || align=right data-sort-value="0.78" | 780 m || 
|-id=586 bgcolor=#FFC2E0
| 253586 ||  || — || October 14, 2003 || Palomar || NEAT || AMO || align=right data-sort-value="0.50" | 500 m || 
|-id=587 bgcolor=#fefefe
| 253587 Cloutier ||  ||  || October 14, 2003 || New Milford || John J. McCarthy Obs. || FLO || align=right | 1.3 km || 
|-id=588 bgcolor=#fefefe
| 253588 ||  || — || October 14, 2003 || Anderson Mesa || LONEOS || FLO || align=right | 1.0 km || 
|-id=589 bgcolor=#fefefe
| 253589 ||  || — || October 14, 2003 || Anderson Mesa || LONEOS || — || align=right | 1.5 km || 
|-id=590 bgcolor=#fefefe
| 253590 ||  || — || October 14, 2003 || Anderson Mesa || LONEOS || — || align=right data-sort-value="0.84" | 840 m || 
|-id=591 bgcolor=#fefefe
| 253591 ||  || — || October 14, 2003 || Anderson Mesa || LONEOS || NYS || align=right data-sort-value="0.75" | 750 m || 
|-id=592 bgcolor=#fefefe
| 253592 ||  || — || October 15, 2003 || Junk Bond || Junk Bond Obs. || NYS || align=right data-sort-value="0.90" | 900 m || 
|-id=593 bgcolor=#fefefe
| 253593 ||  || — || October 15, 2003 || Anderson Mesa || LONEOS || FLO || align=right data-sort-value="0.91" | 910 m || 
|-id=594 bgcolor=#fefefe
| 253594 ||  || — || October 15, 2003 || Anderson Mesa || LONEOS || ERI || align=right | 2.7 km || 
|-id=595 bgcolor=#fefefe
| 253595 ||  || — || October 15, 2003 || Anderson Mesa || LONEOS || ERI || align=right | 1.9 km || 
|-id=596 bgcolor=#fefefe
| 253596 ||  || — || October 15, 2003 || Anderson Mesa || LONEOS || NYS || align=right data-sort-value="0.92" | 920 m || 
|-id=597 bgcolor=#fefefe
| 253597 ||  || — || October 17, 2003 || Socorro || LINEAR || — || align=right | 1.3 km || 
|-id=598 bgcolor=#fefefe
| 253598 ||  || — || October 17, 2003 || Socorro || LINEAR || PHO || align=right | 1.9 km || 
|-id=599 bgcolor=#fefefe
| 253599 ||  || — || October 17, 2003 || Socorro || LINEAR || PHO || align=right | 1.6 km || 
|-id=600 bgcolor=#fefefe
| 253600 ||  || — || October 20, 2003 || Palomar || NEAT || — || align=right | 1.2 km || 
|}

253601–253700 

|-bgcolor=#fefefe
| 253601 ||  || — || October 16, 2003 || Uccle || T. Pauwels || — || align=right | 1.5 km || 
|-id=602 bgcolor=#fefefe
| 253602 ||  || — || October 21, 2003 || Anderson Mesa || LONEOS || — || align=right data-sort-value="0.91" | 910 m || 
|-id=603 bgcolor=#fefefe
| 253603 ||  || — || October 22, 2003 || Kitt Peak || Spacewatch || — || align=right | 1.2 km || 
|-id=604 bgcolor=#fefefe
| 253604 ||  || — || October 23, 2003 || Junk Bond || Junk Bond Obs. || — || align=right | 1.3 km || 
|-id=605 bgcolor=#fefefe
| 253605 ||  || — || October 17, 2003 || Anderson Mesa || LONEOS || FLO || align=right data-sort-value="0.97" | 970 m || 
|-id=606 bgcolor=#fefefe
| 253606 ||  || — || October 18, 2003 || Kitt Peak || Spacewatch || — || align=right data-sort-value="0.90" | 900 m || 
|-id=607 bgcolor=#fefefe
| 253607 ||  || — || October 18, 2003 || Anderson Mesa || LONEOS || — || align=right | 2.2 km || 
|-id=608 bgcolor=#fefefe
| 253608 ||  || — || October 16, 2003 || Kitt Peak || Spacewatch || NYS || align=right data-sort-value="0.71" | 710 m || 
|-id=609 bgcolor=#fefefe
| 253609 ||  || — || October 16, 2003 || Kitt Peak || Spacewatch || — || align=right data-sort-value="0.86" | 860 m || 
|-id=610 bgcolor=#fefefe
| 253610 ||  || — || October 16, 2003 || Haleakala || NEAT || — || align=right | 1.2 km || 
|-id=611 bgcolor=#fefefe
| 253611 ||  || — || October 17, 2003 || Kitt Peak || Spacewatch || — || align=right | 1.2 km || 
|-id=612 bgcolor=#fefefe
| 253612 ||  || — || October 18, 2003 || Kitt Peak || Spacewatch || V || align=right | 1.0 km || 
|-id=613 bgcolor=#fefefe
| 253613 ||  || — || October 18, 2003 || Palomar || NEAT || — || align=right | 2.1 km || 
|-id=614 bgcolor=#fefefe
| 253614 ||  || — || October 18, 2003 || Palomar || NEAT || FLO || align=right data-sort-value="0.90" | 900 m || 
|-id=615 bgcolor=#fefefe
| 253615 ||  || — || October 16, 2003 || Kitt Peak || Spacewatch || — || align=right | 1.1 km || 
|-id=616 bgcolor=#fefefe
| 253616 ||  || — || October 16, 2003 || Palomar || NEAT || — || align=right | 1.1 km || 
|-id=617 bgcolor=#fefefe
| 253617 ||  || — || October 16, 2003 || Palomar || NEAT || V || align=right data-sort-value="0.93" | 930 m || 
|-id=618 bgcolor=#fefefe
| 253618 ||  || — || October 16, 2003 || Palomar || NEAT || V || align=right data-sort-value="0.99" | 990 m || 
|-id=619 bgcolor=#fefefe
| 253619 ||  || — || October 23, 2003 || Kvistaberg || UDAS || — || align=right | 1.1 km || 
|-id=620 bgcolor=#fefefe
| 253620 ||  || — || October 17, 2003 || Kitt Peak || Spacewatch || — || align=right | 1.7 km || 
|-id=621 bgcolor=#fefefe
| 253621 ||  || — || October 16, 2003 || Anderson Mesa || LONEOS || — || align=right | 1.2 km || 
|-id=622 bgcolor=#fefefe
| 253622 ||  || — || October 16, 2003 || Haleakala || NEAT || — || align=right | 1.1 km || 
|-id=623 bgcolor=#fefefe
| 253623 ||  || — || October 19, 2003 || Kitt Peak || Spacewatch || FLO || align=right data-sort-value="0.76" | 760 m || 
|-id=624 bgcolor=#fefefe
| 253624 ||  || — || October 18, 2003 || Palomar || NEAT || PHO || align=right | 1.4 km || 
|-id=625 bgcolor=#fefefe
| 253625 ||  || — || October 18, 2003 || Palomar || NEAT || V || align=right data-sort-value="0.91" | 910 m || 
|-id=626 bgcolor=#fefefe
| 253626 ||  || — || October 20, 2003 || Socorro || LINEAR || V || align=right data-sort-value="0.96" | 960 m || 
|-id=627 bgcolor=#fefefe
| 253627 ||  || — || October 18, 2003 || Kitt Peak || Spacewatch || — || align=right data-sort-value="0.76" | 760 m || 
|-id=628 bgcolor=#fefefe
| 253628 ||  || — || October 18, 2003 || Kitt Peak || Spacewatch || — || align=right | 1.0 km || 
|-id=629 bgcolor=#fefefe
| 253629 ||  || — || October 19, 2003 || Kitt Peak || Spacewatch || — || align=right | 1.1 km || 
|-id=630 bgcolor=#fefefe
| 253630 ||  || — || October 19, 2003 || Anderson Mesa || LONEOS || — || align=right | 1.8 km || 
|-id=631 bgcolor=#fefefe
| 253631 ||  || — || October 20, 2003 || Kitt Peak || Spacewatch || NYS || align=right data-sort-value="0.90" | 900 m || 
|-id=632 bgcolor=#fefefe
| 253632 ||  || — || October 20, 2003 || Socorro || LINEAR || — || align=right | 1.0 km || 
|-id=633 bgcolor=#fefefe
| 253633 ||  || — || October 20, 2003 || Palomar || NEAT || — || align=right | 1.1 km || 
|-id=634 bgcolor=#fefefe
| 253634 ||  || — || October 18, 2003 || Kitt Peak || Spacewatch || NYS || align=right data-sort-value="0.73" | 730 m || 
|-id=635 bgcolor=#fefefe
| 253635 ||  || — || October 19, 2003 || Kitt Peak || Spacewatch || — || align=right data-sort-value="0.91" | 910 m || 
|-id=636 bgcolor=#fefefe
| 253636 ||  || — || October 19, 2003 || Kitt Peak || Spacewatch || — || align=right data-sort-value="0.90" | 900 m || 
|-id=637 bgcolor=#fefefe
| 253637 ||  || — || October 19, 2003 || Kitt Peak || Spacewatch || — || align=right data-sort-value="0.89" | 890 m || 
|-id=638 bgcolor=#fefefe
| 253638 ||  || — || October 19, 2003 || Palomar || NEAT || V || align=right data-sort-value="0.98" | 980 m || 
|-id=639 bgcolor=#fefefe
| 253639 ||  || — || October 20, 2003 || Socorro || LINEAR || FLO || align=right data-sort-value="0.98" | 980 m || 
|-id=640 bgcolor=#fefefe
| 253640 ||  || — || October 20, 2003 || Kitt Peak || Spacewatch || — || align=right data-sort-value="0.75" | 750 m || 
|-id=641 bgcolor=#fefefe
| 253641 ||  || — || October 20, 2003 || Palomar || NEAT || V || align=right | 1.0 km || 
|-id=642 bgcolor=#fefefe
| 253642 ||  || — || October 21, 2003 || Socorro || LINEAR || — || align=right | 1.0 km || 
|-id=643 bgcolor=#fefefe
| 253643 ||  || — || October 18, 2003 || Kitt Peak || Spacewatch || V || align=right data-sort-value="0.72" | 720 m || 
|-id=644 bgcolor=#fefefe
| 253644 ||  || — || October 20, 2003 || Socorro || LINEAR || — || align=right | 1.2 km || 
|-id=645 bgcolor=#fefefe
| 253645 ||  || — || October 21, 2003 || Kitt Peak || Spacewatch || — || align=right | 1.4 km || 
|-id=646 bgcolor=#fefefe
| 253646 ||  || — || October 21, 2003 || Kitt Peak || Spacewatch || V || align=right data-sort-value="0.82" | 820 m || 
|-id=647 bgcolor=#fefefe
| 253647 ||  || — || October 21, 2003 || Kitt Peak || Spacewatch || V || align=right data-sort-value="0.70" | 700 m || 
|-id=648 bgcolor=#fefefe
| 253648 ||  || — || October 20, 2003 || Socorro || LINEAR || FLO || align=right | 1.1 km || 
|-id=649 bgcolor=#E9E9E9
| 253649 ||  || — || October 16, 2003 || Palomar || NEAT || — || align=right | 1.5 km || 
|-id=650 bgcolor=#fefefe
| 253650 ||  || — || October 16, 2003 || Anderson Mesa || LONEOS || V || align=right data-sort-value="0.76" | 760 m || 
|-id=651 bgcolor=#fefefe
| 253651 ||  || — || October 18, 2003 || Anderson Mesa || LONEOS || FLO || align=right data-sort-value="0.96" | 960 m || 
|-id=652 bgcolor=#fefefe
| 253652 ||  || — || October 19, 2003 || Kitt Peak || Spacewatch || NYS || align=right data-sort-value="0.82" | 820 m || 
|-id=653 bgcolor=#fefefe
| 253653 ||  || — || October 20, 2003 || Socorro || LINEAR || NYS || align=right data-sort-value="0.89" | 890 m || 
|-id=654 bgcolor=#fefefe
| 253654 ||  || — || October 20, 2003 || Kitt Peak || Spacewatch || NYS || align=right | 1.9 km || 
|-id=655 bgcolor=#fefefe
| 253655 ||  || — || October 20, 2003 || Socorro || LINEAR || — || align=right data-sort-value="0.97" | 970 m || 
|-id=656 bgcolor=#fefefe
| 253656 ||  || — || October 20, 2003 || Kitt Peak || Spacewatch || — || align=right data-sort-value="0.86" | 860 m || 
|-id=657 bgcolor=#fefefe
| 253657 ||  || — || October 21, 2003 || Kitt Peak || Spacewatch || FLO || align=right data-sort-value="0.81" | 810 m || 
|-id=658 bgcolor=#fefefe
| 253658 ||  || — || October 21, 2003 || Anderson Mesa || LONEOS || — || align=right | 1.0 km || 
|-id=659 bgcolor=#fefefe
| 253659 ||  || — || October 21, 2003 || Socorro || LINEAR || FLO || align=right | 1.0 km || 
|-id=660 bgcolor=#fefefe
| 253660 ||  || — || October 21, 2003 || Socorro || LINEAR || NYS || align=right | 1.8 km || 
|-id=661 bgcolor=#fefefe
| 253661 ||  || — || October 21, 2003 || Kitt Peak || Spacewatch || MAS || align=right data-sort-value="0.77" | 770 m || 
|-id=662 bgcolor=#fefefe
| 253662 ||  || — || October 22, 2003 || Kitt Peak || Spacewatch || — || align=right | 1.0 km || 
|-id=663 bgcolor=#fefefe
| 253663 ||  || — || October 21, 2003 || Anderson Mesa || LONEOS || — || align=right data-sort-value="0.92" | 920 m || 
|-id=664 bgcolor=#fefefe
| 253664 ||  || — || October 21, 2003 || Socorro || LINEAR || NYS || align=right data-sort-value="0.88" | 880 m || 
|-id=665 bgcolor=#fefefe
| 253665 ||  || — || October 21, 2003 || Socorro || LINEAR || NYS || align=right data-sort-value="0.86" | 860 m || 
|-id=666 bgcolor=#fefefe
| 253666 ||  || — || October 22, 2003 || Socorro || LINEAR || FLO || align=right | 1.0 km || 
|-id=667 bgcolor=#fefefe
| 253667 ||  || — || October 22, 2003 || Socorro || LINEAR || — || align=right data-sort-value="0.75" | 750 m || 
|-id=668 bgcolor=#fefefe
| 253668 ||  || — || October 23, 2003 || Anderson Mesa || LONEOS || — || align=right data-sort-value="0.87" | 870 m || 
|-id=669 bgcolor=#fefefe
| 253669 ||  || — || October 20, 2003 || Socorro || LINEAR || — || align=right | 1.0 km || 
|-id=670 bgcolor=#fefefe
| 253670 ||  || — || October 20, 2003 || Kitt Peak || Spacewatch || — || align=right data-sort-value="0.91" | 910 m || 
|-id=671 bgcolor=#fefefe
| 253671 ||  || — || October 21, 2003 || Socorro || LINEAR || V || align=right data-sort-value="0.92" | 920 m || 
|-id=672 bgcolor=#fefefe
| 253672 ||  || — || October 21, 2003 || Palomar || NEAT || NYS || align=right data-sort-value="0.65" | 650 m || 
|-id=673 bgcolor=#fefefe
| 253673 ||  || — || October 23, 2003 || Kitt Peak || Spacewatch || NYS || align=right data-sort-value="0.87" | 870 m || 
|-id=674 bgcolor=#fefefe
| 253674 ||  || — || October 23, 2003 || Kitt Peak || Spacewatch || — || align=right data-sort-value="0.96" | 960 m || 
|-id=675 bgcolor=#fefefe
| 253675 ||  || — || October 21, 2003 || Socorro || LINEAR || — || align=right | 1.2 km || 
|-id=676 bgcolor=#fefefe
| 253676 ||  || — || October 21, 2003 || Kitt Peak || Spacewatch || — || align=right data-sort-value="0.97" | 970 m || 
|-id=677 bgcolor=#fefefe
| 253677 ||  || — || October 22, 2003 || Socorro || LINEAR || — || align=right | 1.5 km || 
|-id=678 bgcolor=#fefefe
| 253678 ||  || — || October 22, 2003 || Socorro || LINEAR || — || align=right | 1.2 km || 
|-id=679 bgcolor=#fefefe
| 253679 ||  || — || October 22, 2003 || Socorro || LINEAR || — || align=right | 1.3 km || 
|-id=680 bgcolor=#fefefe
| 253680 ||  || — || October 22, 2003 || Kitt Peak || Spacewatch || V || align=right data-sort-value="0.70" | 700 m || 
|-id=681 bgcolor=#fefefe
| 253681 ||  || — || October 22, 2003 || Kitt Peak || Spacewatch || — || align=right | 1.3 km || 
|-id=682 bgcolor=#fefefe
| 253682 ||  || — || October 23, 2003 || Kitt Peak || Spacewatch || FLO || align=right data-sort-value="0.94" | 940 m || 
|-id=683 bgcolor=#fefefe
| 253683 ||  || — || October 23, 2003 || Anderson Mesa || LONEOS || NYS || align=right data-sort-value="0.73" | 730 m || 
|-id=684 bgcolor=#fefefe
| 253684 ||  || — || October 23, 2003 || Anderson Mesa || LONEOS || V || align=right | 2.5 km || 
|-id=685 bgcolor=#fefefe
| 253685 ||  || — || October 24, 2003 || Socorro || LINEAR || NYS || align=right data-sort-value="0.75" | 750 m || 
|-id=686 bgcolor=#fefefe
| 253686 ||  || — || October 24, 2003 || Socorro || LINEAR || — || align=right | 1.1 km || 
|-id=687 bgcolor=#fefefe
| 253687 ||  || — || October 23, 2003 || Kitt Peak || Spacewatch || FLO || align=right data-sort-value="0.88" | 880 m || 
|-id=688 bgcolor=#fefefe
| 253688 ||  || — || October 24, 2003 || Socorro || LINEAR || V || align=right | 1.00 km || 
|-id=689 bgcolor=#fefefe
| 253689 ||  || — || October 25, 2003 || Kvistaberg || UDAS || — || align=right | 1.3 km || 
|-id=690 bgcolor=#fefefe
| 253690 ||  || — || October 26, 2003 || Kitt Peak || Spacewatch || NYS || align=right data-sort-value="0.86" | 860 m || 
|-id=691 bgcolor=#fefefe
| 253691 ||  || — || October 25, 2003 || Socorro || LINEAR || V || align=right data-sort-value="0.78" | 780 m || 
|-id=692 bgcolor=#FA8072
| 253692 ||  || — || October 25, 2003 || Socorro || LINEAR || — || align=right | 1.5 km || 
|-id=693 bgcolor=#d6d6d6
| 253693 ||  || — || October 26, 2003 || Kitt Peak || Spacewatch || SYL7:4 || align=right | 5.4 km || 
|-id=694 bgcolor=#fefefe
| 253694 ||  || — || October 27, 2003 || Socorro || LINEAR || V || align=right data-sort-value="0.80" | 800 m || 
|-id=695 bgcolor=#fefefe
| 253695 ||  || — || October 27, 2003 || Socorro || LINEAR || V || align=right data-sort-value="0.92" | 920 m || 
|-id=696 bgcolor=#fefefe
| 253696 ||  || — || October 28, 2003 || Socorro || LINEAR || V || align=right data-sort-value="0.82" | 820 m || 
|-id=697 bgcolor=#fefefe
| 253697 ||  || — || October 28, 2003 || Socorro || LINEAR || FLO || align=right data-sort-value="0.88" | 880 m || 
|-id=698 bgcolor=#fefefe
| 253698 ||  || — || October 28, 2003 || Socorro || LINEAR || ERI || align=right | 1.6 km || 
|-id=699 bgcolor=#fefefe
| 253699 ||  || — || October 29, 2003 || Socorro || LINEAR || — || align=right data-sort-value="0.92" | 920 m || 
|-id=700 bgcolor=#fefefe
| 253700 ||  || — || October 25, 2003 || Socorro || LINEAR || FLO || align=right data-sort-value="0.89" | 890 m || 
|}

253701–253800 

|-bgcolor=#fefefe
| 253701 ||  || — || October 27, 2003 || Kitt Peak || Spacewatch || — || align=right | 1.0 km || 
|-id=702 bgcolor=#fefefe
| 253702 ||  || — || October 27, 2003 || Socorro || LINEAR || — || align=right | 1.2 km || 
|-id=703 bgcolor=#fefefe
| 253703 ||  || — || October 28, 2003 || Socorro || LINEAR || NYS || align=right | 1.6 km || 
|-id=704 bgcolor=#fefefe
| 253704 ||  || — || October 20, 2003 || Socorro || LINEAR || NYS || align=right data-sort-value="0.92" | 920 m || 
|-id=705 bgcolor=#fefefe
| 253705 ||  || — || October 19, 2003 || Kitt Peak || Spacewatch || FLO || align=right data-sort-value="0.59" | 590 m || 
|-id=706 bgcolor=#fefefe
| 253706 ||  || — || October 27, 2003 || Kitt Peak || Spacewatch || FLO || align=right data-sort-value="0.99" | 990 m || 
|-id=707 bgcolor=#fefefe
| 253707 ||  || — || October 19, 2003 || Kitt Peak || Spacewatch || FLO || align=right data-sort-value="0.78" | 780 m || 
|-id=708 bgcolor=#fefefe
| 253708 ||  || — || October 24, 2003 || Socorro || LINEAR || MAS || align=right data-sort-value="0.93" | 930 m || 
|-id=709 bgcolor=#fefefe
| 253709 ||  || — || October 29, 2003 || Socorro || LINEAR || — || align=right | 1.2 km || 
|-id=710 bgcolor=#fefefe
| 253710 ||  || — || October 19, 2003 || Kitt Peak || Spacewatch || NYS || align=right data-sort-value="0.72" | 720 m || 
|-id=711 bgcolor=#fefefe
| 253711 ||  || — || October 22, 2003 || Apache Point || SDSS || — || align=right data-sort-value="0.90" | 900 m || 
|-id=712 bgcolor=#fefefe
| 253712 ||  || — || November 3, 2003 || Socorro || LINEAR || — || align=right | 1.3 km || 
|-id=713 bgcolor=#fefefe
| 253713 ||  || — || November 15, 2003 || Kitt Peak || Spacewatch || — || align=right data-sort-value="0.91" | 910 m || 
|-id=714 bgcolor=#fefefe
| 253714 ||  || — || November 14, 2003 || Palomar || NEAT || V || align=right data-sort-value="0.97" | 970 m || 
|-id=715 bgcolor=#fefefe
| 253715 ||  || — || November 15, 2003 || Kitt Peak || Spacewatch || NYS || align=right data-sort-value="0.84" | 840 m || 
|-id=716 bgcolor=#fefefe
| 253716 ||  || — || November 3, 2003 || Socorro || LINEAR || PHO || align=right | 1.8 km || 
|-id=717 bgcolor=#fefefe
| 253717 ||  || — || November 15, 2003 || Kitt Peak || Spacewatch || FLO || align=right data-sort-value="0.93" | 930 m || 
|-id=718 bgcolor=#fefefe
| 253718 ||  || — || November 16, 2003 || Catalina || CSS || — || align=right | 1.2 km || 
|-id=719 bgcolor=#fefefe
| 253719 ||  || — || November 16, 2003 || Catalina || CSS || FLO || align=right data-sort-value="0.89" | 890 m || 
|-id=720 bgcolor=#fefefe
| 253720 ||  || — || November 18, 2003 || Palomar || NEAT || NYS || align=right data-sort-value="0.79" | 790 m || 
|-id=721 bgcolor=#fefefe
| 253721 ||  || — || November 18, 2003 || Palomar || NEAT || — || align=right | 1.1 km || 
|-id=722 bgcolor=#fefefe
| 253722 ||  || — || November 18, 2003 || Palomar || NEAT || — || align=right | 1.3 km || 
|-id=723 bgcolor=#fefefe
| 253723 ||  || — || November 16, 2003 || Kitt Peak || Spacewatch || NYS || align=right data-sort-value="0.80" | 800 m || 
|-id=724 bgcolor=#fefefe
| 253724 ||  || — || November 16, 2003 || Catalina || CSS || — || align=right data-sort-value="0.91" | 910 m || 
|-id=725 bgcolor=#fefefe
| 253725 ||  || — || November 16, 2003 || Kitt Peak || Spacewatch || V || align=right data-sort-value="0.85" | 850 m || 
|-id=726 bgcolor=#fefefe
| 253726 ||  || — || November 18, 2003 || Kitt Peak || Spacewatch || V || align=right data-sort-value="0.95" | 950 m || 
|-id=727 bgcolor=#fefefe
| 253727 ||  || — || November 18, 2003 || Palomar || NEAT || V || align=right data-sort-value="0.96" | 960 m || 
|-id=728 bgcolor=#fefefe
| 253728 ||  || — || November 16, 2003 || Kitt Peak || Spacewatch || — || align=right | 1.2 km || 
|-id=729 bgcolor=#fefefe
| 253729 ||  || — || November 16, 2003 || Kitt Peak || Spacewatch || FLO || align=right data-sort-value="0.70" | 700 m || 
|-id=730 bgcolor=#fefefe
| 253730 ||  || — || November 18, 2003 || Palomar || NEAT || — || align=right | 1.3 km || 
|-id=731 bgcolor=#fefefe
| 253731 ||  || — || November 19, 2003 || Socorro || LINEAR || — || align=right | 1.0 km || 
|-id=732 bgcolor=#fefefe
| 253732 ||  || — || November 17, 2003 || Catalina || CSS || PHO || align=right | 1.4 km || 
|-id=733 bgcolor=#fefefe
| 253733 ||  || — || November 18, 2003 || Kitt Peak || Spacewatch || — || align=right data-sort-value="0.94" | 940 m || 
|-id=734 bgcolor=#fefefe
| 253734 ||  || — || November 18, 2003 || Kitt Peak || Spacewatch || V || align=right data-sort-value="0.85" | 850 m || 
|-id=735 bgcolor=#fefefe
| 253735 ||  || — || November 18, 2003 || Kitt Peak || Spacewatch || — || align=right | 1.2 km || 
|-id=736 bgcolor=#fefefe
| 253736 ||  || — || November 18, 2003 || Palomar || NEAT || V || align=right data-sort-value="0.89" | 890 m || 
|-id=737 bgcolor=#fefefe
| 253737 ||  || — || November 19, 2003 || Kitt Peak || Spacewatch || — || align=right | 1.4 km || 
|-id=738 bgcolor=#fefefe
| 253738 ||  || — || November 19, 2003 || Kitt Peak || Spacewatch || FLO || align=right data-sort-value="0.99" | 990 m || 
|-id=739 bgcolor=#fefefe
| 253739 ||  || — || November 19, 2003 || Socorro || LINEAR || V || align=right data-sort-value="0.96" | 960 m || 
|-id=740 bgcolor=#fefefe
| 253740 ||  || — || November 20, 2003 || Needville || Needville Obs. || — || align=right data-sort-value="0.96" | 960 m || 
|-id=741 bgcolor=#fefefe
| 253741 ||  || — || November 19, 2003 || Socorro || LINEAR || — || align=right | 1.2 km || 
|-id=742 bgcolor=#fefefe
| 253742 ||  || — || November 19, 2003 || Palomar || NEAT || NYS || align=right data-sort-value="0.69" | 690 m || 
|-id=743 bgcolor=#fefefe
| 253743 ||  || — || November 20, 2003 || Socorro || LINEAR || — || align=right | 1.3 km || 
|-id=744 bgcolor=#fefefe
| 253744 ||  || — || November 21, 2003 || Socorro || LINEAR || — || align=right | 1.4 km || 
|-id=745 bgcolor=#d6d6d6
| 253745 ||  || — || November 19, 2003 || Kitt Peak || Spacewatch || EOS || align=right | 2.3 km || 
|-id=746 bgcolor=#fefefe
| 253746 ||  || — || November 19, 2003 || Kitt Peak || Spacewatch || — || align=right | 1.3 km || 
|-id=747 bgcolor=#fefefe
| 253747 ||  || — || November 19, 2003 || Kitt Peak || Spacewatch || NYS || align=right data-sort-value="0.81" | 810 m || 
|-id=748 bgcolor=#fefefe
| 253748 ||  || — || November 19, 2003 || Kitt Peak || Spacewatch || — || align=right | 1.0 km || 
|-id=749 bgcolor=#fefefe
| 253749 ||  || — || November 20, 2003 || Kitt Peak || Spacewatch || V || align=right data-sort-value="0.66" | 660 m || 
|-id=750 bgcolor=#fefefe
| 253750 ||  || — || November 20, 2003 || Socorro || LINEAR || ERI || align=right | 2.0 km || 
|-id=751 bgcolor=#fefefe
| 253751 ||  || — || November 19, 2003 || Socorro || LINEAR || V || align=right data-sort-value="0.97" | 970 m || 
|-id=752 bgcolor=#fefefe
| 253752 ||  || — || November 16, 2003 || Catalina || CSS || — || align=right data-sort-value="0.98" | 980 m || 
|-id=753 bgcolor=#fefefe
| 253753 ||  || — || November 18, 2003 || Palomar || NEAT || — || align=right | 1.2 km || 
|-id=754 bgcolor=#fefefe
| 253754 ||  || — || November 19, 2003 || Anderson Mesa || LONEOS || — || align=right | 1.2 km || 
|-id=755 bgcolor=#fefefe
| 253755 ||  || — || November 20, 2003 || Socorro || LINEAR || NYS || align=right data-sort-value="0.76" | 760 m || 
|-id=756 bgcolor=#fefefe
| 253756 ||  || — || November 20, 2003 || Socorro || LINEAR || NYS || align=right data-sort-value="0.98" | 980 m || 
|-id=757 bgcolor=#fefefe
| 253757 ||  || — || November 21, 2003 || Socorro || LINEAR || — || align=right data-sort-value="0.84" | 840 m || 
|-id=758 bgcolor=#fefefe
| 253758 ||  || — || November 21, 2003 || Socorro || LINEAR || — || align=right | 1.1 km || 
|-id=759 bgcolor=#fefefe
| 253759 ||  || — || November 21, 2003 || Socorro || LINEAR || MAS || align=right data-sort-value="0.94" | 940 m || 
|-id=760 bgcolor=#fefefe
| 253760 ||  || — || November 21, 2003 || Socorro || LINEAR || MAS || align=right | 1.1 km || 
|-id=761 bgcolor=#fefefe
| 253761 ||  || — || November 21, 2003 || Socorro || LINEAR || — || align=right | 1.3 km || 
|-id=762 bgcolor=#fefefe
| 253762 ||  || — || November 21, 2003 || Socorro || LINEAR || — || align=right | 1.1 km || 
|-id=763 bgcolor=#fefefe
| 253763 ||  || — || November 20, 2003 || Kitt Peak || Spacewatch || V || align=right data-sort-value="0.82" | 820 m || 
|-id=764 bgcolor=#fefefe
| 253764 ||  || — || November 20, 2003 || Socorro || LINEAR || — || align=right data-sort-value="0.83" | 830 m || 
|-id=765 bgcolor=#fefefe
| 253765 ||  || — || November 20, 2003 || Socorro || LINEAR || — || align=right | 1.2 km || 
|-id=766 bgcolor=#fefefe
| 253766 ||  || — || November 20, 2003 || Socorro || LINEAR || V || align=right data-sort-value="0.99" | 990 m || 
|-id=767 bgcolor=#fefefe
| 253767 ||  || — || November 20, 2003 || Socorro || LINEAR || V || align=right data-sort-value="0.78" | 780 m || 
|-id=768 bgcolor=#fefefe
| 253768 ||  || — || November 20, 2003 || Socorro || LINEAR || V || align=right | 1.1 km || 
|-id=769 bgcolor=#fefefe
| 253769 ||  || — || November 20, 2003 || Socorro || LINEAR || PHO || align=right | 2.0 km || 
|-id=770 bgcolor=#fefefe
| 253770 ||  || — || November 20, 2003 || Socorro || LINEAR || — || align=right | 2.2 km || 
|-id=771 bgcolor=#fefefe
| 253771 ||  || — || November 21, 2003 || Palomar || NEAT || NYS || align=right data-sort-value="0.66" | 660 m || 
|-id=772 bgcolor=#fefefe
| 253772 ||  || — || November 21, 2003 || Socorro || LINEAR || — || align=right | 1.1 km || 
|-id=773 bgcolor=#fefefe
| 253773 ||  || — || November 21, 2003 || Socorro || LINEAR || — || align=right data-sort-value="0.99" | 990 m || 
|-id=774 bgcolor=#fefefe
| 253774 ||  || — || November 21, 2003 || Socorro || LINEAR || NYS || align=right | 1.2 km || 
|-id=775 bgcolor=#fefefe
| 253775 ||  || — || November 21, 2003 || Socorro || LINEAR || FLO || align=right | 1.3 km || 
|-id=776 bgcolor=#fefefe
| 253776 ||  || — || November 21, 2003 || Socorro || LINEAR || EUT || align=right data-sort-value="0.83" | 830 m || 
|-id=777 bgcolor=#fefefe
| 253777 ||  || — || November 21, 2003 || Socorro || LINEAR || — || align=right | 1.2 km || 
|-id=778 bgcolor=#fefefe
| 253778 ||  || — || November 21, 2003 || Socorro || LINEAR || — || align=right | 1.6 km || 
|-id=779 bgcolor=#fefefe
| 253779 ||  || — || November 23, 2003 || Socorro || LINEAR || — || align=right | 1.3 km || 
|-id=780 bgcolor=#fefefe
| 253780 ||  || — || November 21, 2003 || Socorro || LINEAR || MAS || align=right data-sort-value="0.90" | 900 m || 
|-id=781 bgcolor=#fefefe
| 253781 ||  || — || November 24, 2003 || Anderson Mesa || LONEOS || NYS || align=right data-sort-value="0.82" | 820 m || 
|-id=782 bgcolor=#fefefe
| 253782 ||  || — || November 24, 2003 || Socorro || LINEAR || — || align=right | 1.1 km || 
|-id=783 bgcolor=#fefefe
| 253783 ||  || — || November 24, 2003 || Anderson Mesa || LONEOS || NYS || align=right data-sort-value="0.81" | 810 m || 
|-id=784 bgcolor=#fefefe
| 253784 ||  || — || November 26, 2003 || Kitt Peak || Spacewatch || V || align=right | 1.0 km || 
|-id=785 bgcolor=#fefefe
| 253785 ||  || — || November 30, 2003 || Kitt Peak || Spacewatch || EUT || align=right data-sort-value="0.81" | 810 m || 
|-id=786 bgcolor=#fefefe
| 253786 ||  || — || November 30, 2003 || Kitt Peak || Spacewatch || MAS || align=right data-sort-value="0.91" | 910 m || 
|-id=787 bgcolor=#fefefe
| 253787 ||  || — || November 18, 2003 || Kitt Peak || Spacewatch || V || align=right data-sort-value="0.78" | 780 m || 
|-id=788 bgcolor=#fefefe
| 253788 ||  || — || November 19, 2003 || Palomar || NEAT || — || align=right | 1.00 km || 
|-id=789 bgcolor=#fefefe
| 253789 ||  || — || November 23, 2003 || Anderson Mesa || LONEOS || — || align=right | 1.1 km || 
|-id=790 bgcolor=#fefefe
| 253790 ||  || — || November 18, 2003 || Palomar || NEAT || — || align=right | 1.2 km || 
|-id=791 bgcolor=#fefefe
| 253791 ||  || — || November 21, 2003 || Kitt Peak || M. W. Buie || MAS || align=right | 1.1 km || 
|-id=792 bgcolor=#fefefe
| 253792 ||  || — || November 21, 2003 || Socorro || LINEAR || NYS || align=right data-sort-value="0.93" | 930 m || 
|-id=793 bgcolor=#fefefe
| 253793 ||  || — || November 20, 2003 || Socorro || LINEAR || — || align=right | 1.0 km || 
|-id=794 bgcolor=#fefefe
| 253794 ||  || — || November 19, 2003 || Kitt Peak || Spacewatch || NYS || align=right data-sort-value="0.64" | 640 m || 
|-id=795 bgcolor=#fefefe
| 253795 ||  || — || December 1, 2003 || Socorro || LINEAR || — || align=right | 1.3 km || 
|-id=796 bgcolor=#fefefe
| 253796 ||  || — || December 3, 2003 || Socorro || LINEAR || — || align=right | 1.1 km || 
|-id=797 bgcolor=#fefefe
| 253797 ||  || — || December 3, 2003 || Socorro || LINEAR || — || align=right | 1.1 km || 
|-id=798 bgcolor=#fefefe
| 253798 ||  || — || December 15, 2003 || Kitt Peak || Spacewatch || ERI || align=right | 2.6 km || 
|-id=799 bgcolor=#fefefe
| 253799 ||  || — || December 14, 2003 || Kitt Peak || Spacewatch || — || align=right | 1.6 km || 
|-id=800 bgcolor=#fefefe
| 253800 ||  || — || December 14, 2003 || Kitt Peak || Spacewatch || — || align=right | 1.4 km || 
|}

253801–253900 

|-bgcolor=#fefefe
| 253801 ||  || — || December 1, 2003 || Kitt Peak || Spacewatch || — || align=right | 1.6 km || 
|-id=802 bgcolor=#fefefe
| 253802 ||  || — || December 1, 2003 || Kitt Peak || Spacewatch || — || align=right | 1.1 km || 
|-id=803 bgcolor=#E9E9E9
| 253803 ||  || — || December 1, 2003 || Socorro || LINEAR || — || align=right | 2.9 km || 
|-id=804 bgcolor=#fefefe
| 253804 ||  || — || December 4, 2003 || Socorro || LINEAR || — || align=right | 1.1 km || 
|-id=805 bgcolor=#fefefe
| 253805 ||  || — || December 4, 2003 || Socorro || LINEAR || — || align=right | 1.0 km || 
|-id=806 bgcolor=#fefefe
| 253806 ||  || — || December 14, 2003 || Kitt Peak || Spacewatch || V || align=right | 1.0 km || 
|-id=807 bgcolor=#fefefe
| 253807 ||  || — || December 17, 2003 || Anderson Mesa || LONEOS || V || align=right data-sort-value="0.86" | 860 m || 
|-id=808 bgcolor=#fefefe
| 253808 ||  || — || December 17, 2003 || Anderson Mesa || LONEOS || ERI || align=right | 2.2 km || 
|-id=809 bgcolor=#fefefe
| 253809 ||  || — || December 16, 2003 || Catalina || CSS || — || align=right | 1.3 km || 
|-id=810 bgcolor=#fefefe
| 253810 ||  || — || December 17, 2003 || Anderson Mesa || LONEOS || NYS || align=right | 1.0 km || 
|-id=811 bgcolor=#fefefe
| 253811 ||  || — || December 18, 2003 || Socorro || LINEAR || — || align=right | 1.5 km || 
|-id=812 bgcolor=#fefefe
| 253812 ||  || — || December 17, 2003 || Kitt Peak || Spacewatch || — || align=right | 1.4 km || 
|-id=813 bgcolor=#fefefe
| 253813 ||  || — || December 18, 2003 || Socorro || LINEAR || — || align=right data-sort-value="0.96" | 960 m || 
|-id=814 bgcolor=#E9E9E9
| 253814 ||  || — || December 16, 2003 || Anderson Mesa || LONEOS || — || align=right | 1.8 km || 
|-id=815 bgcolor=#fefefe
| 253815 ||  || — || December 17, 2003 || Anderson Mesa || LONEOS || V || align=right data-sort-value="0.96" | 960 m || 
|-id=816 bgcolor=#fefefe
| 253816 ||  || — || December 17, 2003 || Anderson Mesa || LONEOS || V || align=right data-sort-value="0.83" | 830 m || 
|-id=817 bgcolor=#fefefe
| 253817 ||  || — || December 18, 2003 || Socorro || LINEAR || V || align=right | 1.2 km || 
|-id=818 bgcolor=#fefefe
| 253818 ||  || — || December 18, 2003 || Socorro || LINEAR || FLO || align=right | 1.0 km || 
|-id=819 bgcolor=#d6d6d6
| 253819 ||  || — || December 19, 2003 || Socorro || LINEAR || 3:2 || align=right | 5.7 km || 
|-id=820 bgcolor=#fefefe
| 253820 ||  || — || December 19, 2003 || Socorro || LINEAR || — || align=right | 1.2 km || 
|-id=821 bgcolor=#fefefe
| 253821 ||  || — || December 19, 2003 || Socorro || LINEAR || NYS || align=right | 1.0 km || 
|-id=822 bgcolor=#FA8072
| 253822 ||  || — || December 19, 2003 || Socorro || LINEAR || — || align=right | 2.1 km || 
|-id=823 bgcolor=#fefefe
| 253823 ||  || — || December 19, 2003 || Socorro || LINEAR || — || align=right | 1.3 km || 
|-id=824 bgcolor=#fefefe
| 253824 ||  || — || December 19, 2003 || Socorro || LINEAR || NYS || align=right data-sort-value="0.88" | 880 m || 
|-id=825 bgcolor=#fefefe
| 253825 ||  || — || December 19, 2003 || Socorro || LINEAR || NYS || align=right | 1.1 km || 
|-id=826 bgcolor=#fefefe
| 253826 ||  || — || December 18, 2003 || Socorro || LINEAR || NYS || align=right | 1.0 km || 
|-id=827 bgcolor=#fefefe
| 253827 ||  || — || December 18, 2003 || Socorro || LINEAR || NYS || align=right data-sort-value="0.84" | 840 m || 
|-id=828 bgcolor=#fefefe
| 253828 ||  || — || December 18, 2003 || Socorro || LINEAR || NYS || align=right data-sort-value="0.82" | 820 m || 
|-id=829 bgcolor=#fefefe
| 253829 ||  || — || December 18, 2003 || Socorro || LINEAR || — || align=right | 1.2 km || 
|-id=830 bgcolor=#fefefe
| 253830 ||  || — || December 18, 2003 || Socorro || LINEAR || NYS || align=right data-sort-value="0.87" | 870 m || 
|-id=831 bgcolor=#fefefe
| 253831 ||  || — || December 18, 2003 || Socorro || LINEAR || V || align=right | 1.0 km || 
|-id=832 bgcolor=#fefefe
| 253832 ||  || — || December 18, 2003 || Socorro || LINEAR || NYS || align=right data-sort-value="0.92" | 920 m || 
|-id=833 bgcolor=#fefefe
| 253833 ||  || — || December 19, 2003 || Needville || Needville Obs. || — || align=right | 1.2 km || 
|-id=834 bgcolor=#fefefe
| 253834 ||  || — || December 19, 2003 || Socorro || LINEAR || V || align=right data-sort-value="0.84" | 840 m || 
|-id=835 bgcolor=#fefefe
| 253835 ||  || — || December 19, 2003 || Kitt Peak || Spacewatch || NYS || align=right data-sort-value="0.97" | 970 m || 
|-id=836 bgcolor=#fefefe
| 253836 ||  || — || December 19, 2003 || Socorro || LINEAR || PHO || align=right | 2.0 km || 
|-id=837 bgcolor=#E9E9E9
| 253837 ||  || — || December 19, 2003 || Socorro || LINEAR || RAF || align=right | 1.6 km || 
|-id=838 bgcolor=#fefefe
| 253838 ||  || — || December 23, 2003 || Socorro || LINEAR || — || align=right | 1.2 km || 
|-id=839 bgcolor=#fefefe
| 253839 ||  || — || December 27, 2003 || Socorro || LINEAR || NYS || align=right | 1.1 km || 
|-id=840 bgcolor=#fefefe
| 253840 ||  || — || December 27, 2003 || Socorro || LINEAR || — || align=right data-sort-value="0.97" | 970 m || 
|-id=841 bgcolor=#FFC2E0
| 253841 ||  || — || December 28, 2003 || Socorro || LINEAR || APO +1kmPHA || align=right | 1.4 km || 
|-id=842 bgcolor=#fefefe
| 253842 ||  || — || December 27, 2003 || Socorro || LINEAR || — || align=right data-sort-value="0.71" | 710 m || 
|-id=843 bgcolor=#fefefe
| 253843 ||  || — || December 27, 2003 || Socorro || LINEAR || — || align=right data-sort-value="0.93" | 930 m || 
|-id=844 bgcolor=#fefefe
| 253844 ||  || — || December 28, 2003 || Socorro || LINEAR || — || align=right | 1.3 km || 
|-id=845 bgcolor=#fefefe
| 253845 ||  || — || December 28, 2003 || Socorro || LINEAR || — || align=right data-sort-value="0.98" | 980 m || 
|-id=846 bgcolor=#fefefe
| 253846 ||  || — || December 28, 2003 || Socorro || LINEAR || — || align=right | 1.3 km || 
|-id=847 bgcolor=#fefefe
| 253847 ||  || — || December 28, 2003 || Socorro || LINEAR || — || align=right | 1.2 km || 
|-id=848 bgcolor=#fefefe
| 253848 ||  || — || December 27, 2003 || Socorro || LINEAR || MAS || align=right | 1.0 km || 
|-id=849 bgcolor=#fefefe
| 253849 ||  || — || December 27, 2003 || Socorro || LINEAR || — || align=right | 1.3 km || 
|-id=850 bgcolor=#fefefe
| 253850 ||  || — || December 29, 2003 || Socorro || LINEAR || — || align=right | 1.7 km || 
|-id=851 bgcolor=#E9E9E9
| 253851 ||  || — || December 29, 2003 || Socorro || LINEAR || — || align=right | 2.6 km || 
|-id=852 bgcolor=#fefefe
| 253852 ||  || — || December 16, 2003 || Kitt Peak || Spacewatch || — || align=right | 1.1 km || 
|-id=853 bgcolor=#fefefe
| 253853 ||  || — || December 17, 2003 || Socorro || LINEAR || V || align=right | 1.2 km || 
|-id=854 bgcolor=#fefefe
| 253854 ||  || — || December 18, 2003 || Socorro || LINEAR || V || align=right | 1.0 km || 
|-id=855 bgcolor=#fefefe
| 253855 ||  || — || December 18, 2003 || Socorro || LINEAR || — || align=right | 1.4 km || 
|-id=856 bgcolor=#E9E9E9
| 253856 ||  || — || December 18, 2003 || Socorro || LINEAR || — || align=right | 3.3 km || 
|-id=857 bgcolor=#fefefe
| 253857 ||  || — || December 23, 2003 || Socorro || LINEAR || V || align=right | 1.2 km || 
|-id=858 bgcolor=#fefefe
| 253858 ||  || — || December 29, 2003 || Kitt Peak || Spacewatch || NYS || align=right data-sort-value="0.91" | 910 m || 
|-id=859 bgcolor=#fefefe
| 253859 || 2004 AL || — || January 11, 2004 || Wrightwood || J. W. Young || — || align=right data-sort-value="0.81" | 810 m || 
|-id=860 bgcolor=#fefefe
| 253860 ||  || — || January 13, 2004 || Anderson Mesa || LONEOS || — || align=right | 1.2 km || 
|-id=861 bgcolor=#fefefe
| 253861 ||  || — || January 12, 2004 || Palomar || NEAT || NYS || align=right data-sort-value="0.96" | 960 m || 
|-id=862 bgcolor=#fefefe
| 253862 ||  || — || January 13, 2004 || Anderson Mesa || LONEOS || — || align=right | 1.2 km || 
|-id=863 bgcolor=#fefefe
| 253863 ||  || — || January 13, 2004 || Anderson Mesa || LONEOS || — || align=right | 1.5 km || 
|-id=864 bgcolor=#fefefe
| 253864 ||  || — || January 15, 2004 || Kitt Peak || Spacewatch || NYS || align=right data-sort-value="0.64" | 640 m || 
|-id=865 bgcolor=#fefefe
| 253865 ||  || — || January 15, 2004 || Kitt Peak || Spacewatch || — || align=right data-sort-value="0.82" | 820 m || 
|-id=866 bgcolor=#E9E9E9
| 253866 ||  || — || January 12, 2004 || Palomar || NEAT || — || align=right | 2.7 km || 
|-id=867 bgcolor=#fefefe
| 253867 ||  || — || January 16, 2004 || Palomar || NEAT || MAS || align=right data-sort-value="0.90" | 900 m || 
|-id=868 bgcolor=#fefefe
| 253868 ||  || — || January 16, 2004 || Palomar || NEAT || MAS || align=right | 1.3 km || 
|-id=869 bgcolor=#fefefe
| 253869 ||  || — || January 16, 2004 || Palomar || NEAT || MAS || align=right data-sort-value="0.96" | 960 m || 
|-id=870 bgcolor=#fefefe
| 253870 ||  || — || January 16, 2004 || Palomar || NEAT || — || align=right data-sort-value="0.93" | 930 m || 
|-id=871 bgcolor=#fefefe
| 253871 ||  || — || January 16, 2004 || Kitt Peak || Spacewatch || — || align=right | 1.7 km || 
|-id=872 bgcolor=#fefefe
| 253872 ||  || — || January 16, 2004 || Palomar || NEAT || — || align=right | 1.3 km || 
|-id=873 bgcolor=#fefefe
| 253873 ||  || — || January 16, 2004 || Palomar || NEAT || — || align=right data-sort-value="0.83" | 830 m || 
|-id=874 bgcolor=#fefefe
| 253874 ||  || — || January 17, 2004 || Palomar || NEAT || — || align=right | 1.2 km || 
|-id=875 bgcolor=#E9E9E9
| 253875 ||  || — || January 17, 2004 || Palomar || NEAT || — || align=right | 1.8 km || 
|-id=876 bgcolor=#fefefe
| 253876 ||  || — || January 16, 2004 || Kitt Peak || Spacewatch || — || align=right | 1.1 km || 
|-id=877 bgcolor=#fefefe
| 253877 ||  || — || January 19, 2004 || Anderson Mesa || LONEOS || ERI || align=right | 1.9 km || 
|-id=878 bgcolor=#fefefe
| 253878 ||  || — || January 19, 2004 || Kitt Peak || Spacewatch || — || align=right data-sort-value="0.70" | 700 m || 
|-id=879 bgcolor=#fefefe
| 253879 ||  || — || January 19, 2004 || Anderson Mesa || LONEOS || — || align=right data-sort-value="0.83" | 830 m || 
|-id=880 bgcolor=#fefefe
| 253880 ||  || — || January 19, 2004 || Catalina || CSS || — || align=right | 1.1 km || 
|-id=881 bgcolor=#fefefe
| 253881 ||  || — || January 19, 2004 || Kitt Peak || Spacewatch || NYS || align=right data-sort-value="0.95" | 950 m || 
|-id=882 bgcolor=#fefefe
| 253882 ||  || — || January 19, 2004 || Kitt Peak || Spacewatch || MAS || align=right data-sort-value="0.82" | 820 m || 
|-id=883 bgcolor=#fefefe
| 253883 ||  || — || January 22, 2004 || Socorro || LINEAR || ERI || align=right | 2.3 km || 
|-id=884 bgcolor=#fefefe
| 253884 ||  || — || January 21, 2004 || Socorro || LINEAR || — || align=right data-sort-value="0.99" | 990 m || 
|-id=885 bgcolor=#fefefe
| 253885 ||  || — || January 21, 2004 || Socorro || LINEAR || — || align=right | 1.3 km || 
|-id=886 bgcolor=#fefefe
| 253886 ||  || — || January 21, 2004 || Socorro || LINEAR || ERI || align=right | 2.3 km || 
|-id=887 bgcolor=#fefefe
| 253887 ||  || — || January 22, 2004 || Socorro || LINEAR || — || align=right data-sort-value="0.91" | 910 m || 
|-id=888 bgcolor=#fefefe
| 253888 ||  || — || January 22, 2004 || Socorro || LINEAR || NYS || align=right | 1.0 km || 
|-id=889 bgcolor=#E9E9E9
| 253889 ||  || — || January 23, 2004 || Socorro || LINEAR || MAR || align=right | 1.6 km || 
|-id=890 bgcolor=#fefefe
| 253890 ||  || — || January 24, 2004 || Socorro || LINEAR || — || align=right | 1.2 km || 
|-id=891 bgcolor=#fefefe
| 253891 ||  || — || January 22, 2004 || Socorro || LINEAR || MAS || align=right data-sort-value="0.93" | 930 m || 
|-id=892 bgcolor=#fefefe
| 253892 ||  || — || January 22, 2004 || Socorro || LINEAR || — || align=right | 1.2 km || 
|-id=893 bgcolor=#E9E9E9
| 253893 ||  || — || January 27, 2004 || Anderson Mesa || LONEOS || EUN || align=right | 1.9 km || 
|-id=894 bgcolor=#fefefe
| 253894 ||  || — || January 27, 2004 || Anderson Mesa || LONEOS || — || align=right | 1.2 km || 
|-id=895 bgcolor=#E9E9E9
| 253895 ||  || — || January 28, 2004 || Kitt Peak || Spacewatch || — || align=right | 1.8 km || 
|-id=896 bgcolor=#E9E9E9
| 253896 ||  || — || January 28, 2004 || Haleakala || NEAT || — || align=right | 1.7 km || 
|-id=897 bgcolor=#E9E9E9
| 253897 ||  || — || January 28, 2004 || Socorro || LINEAR || — || align=right | 4.4 km || 
|-id=898 bgcolor=#FA8072
| 253898 ||  || — || January 30, 2004 || Socorro || LINEAR || — || align=right | 2.1 km || 
|-id=899 bgcolor=#fefefe
| 253899 ||  || — || January 28, 2004 || Catalina || CSS || ERI || align=right | 2.1 km || 
|-id=900 bgcolor=#E9E9E9
| 253900 ||  || — || January 24, 2004 || Socorro || LINEAR || KON || align=right | 3.6 km || 
|}

253901–254000 

|-bgcolor=#fefefe
| 253901 ||  || — || January 27, 2004 || Kitt Peak || Spacewatch || NYS || align=right data-sort-value="0.65" | 650 m || 
|-id=902 bgcolor=#fefefe
| 253902 ||  || — || January 17, 2004 || Palomar || NEAT || — || align=right | 1.4 km || 
|-id=903 bgcolor=#fefefe
| 253903 ||  || — || January 16, 2004 || Kitt Peak || Spacewatch || NYS || align=right data-sort-value="0.76" | 760 m || 
|-id=904 bgcolor=#fefefe
| 253904 ||  || — || January 19, 2004 || Kitt Peak || Spacewatch || NYS || align=right data-sort-value="0.65" | 650 m || 
|-id=905 bgcolor=#E9E9E9
| 253905 ||  || — || January 22, 2004 || Socorro || LINEAR || — || align=right | 3.0 km || 
|-id=906 bgcolor=#fefefe
| 253906 ||  || — || January 17, 2004 || Palomar || NEAT || MAS || align=right data-sort-value="0.76" | 760 m || 
|-id=907 bgcolor=#fefefe
| 253907 ||  || — || January 27, 2004 || Kitt Peak || Spacewatch || — || align=right | 1.4 km || 
|-id=908 bgcolor=#fefefe
| 253908 ||  || — || January 29, 2004 || Socorro || LINEAR || ERI || align=right | 2.3 km || 
|-id=909 bgcolor=#fefefe
| 253909 ||  || — || February 10, 2004 || Palomar || NEAT || ERI || align=right | 2.1 km || 
|-id=910 bgcolor=#d6d6d6
| 253910 ||  || — || February 11, 2004 || Kitt Peak || Spacewatch || THM || align=right | 2.7 km || 
|-id=911 bgcolor=#E9E9E9
| 253911 ||  || — || February 11, 2004 || Palomar || NEAT || — || align=right | 2.7 km || 
|-id=912 bgcolor=#fefefe
| 253912 ||  || — || February 11, 2004 || Palomar || NEAT || MAS || align=right | 1.2 km || 
|-id=913 bgcolor=#E9E9E9
| 253913 ||  || — || February 11, 2004 || Kitt Peak || Spacewatch || — || align=right | 1.9 km || 
|-id=914 bgcolor=#fefefe
| 253914 ||  || — || February 11, 2004 || Kitt Peak || Spacewatch || MAS || align=right data-sort-value="0.93" | 930 m || 
|-id=915 bgcolor=#fefefe
| 253915 ||  || — || February 11, 2004 || Kitt Peak || Spacewatch || NYS || align=right data-sort-value="0.94" | 940 m || 
|-id=916 bgcolor=#E9E9E9
| 253916 ||  || — || February 12, 2004 || Palomar || NEAT || RAF || align=right | 1.3 km || 
|-id=917 bgcolor=#fefefe
| 253917 ||  || — || February 11, 2004 || Kitt Peak || Spacewatch || — || align=right data-sort-value="0.75" | 750 m || 
|-id=918 bgcolor=#E9E9E9
| 253918 ||  || — || February 11, 2004 || Palomar || NEAT || — || align=right | 1.4 km || 
|-id=919 bgcolor=#fefefe
| 253919 ||  || — || February 12, 2004 || Kitt Peak || Spacewatch || — || align=right | 1.2 km || 
|-id=920 bgcolor=#fefefe
| 253920 ||  || — || February 12, 2004 || Kitt Peak || Spacewatch || MAS || align=right data-sort-value="0.63" | 630 m || 
|-id=921 bgcolor=#fefefe
| 253921 ||  || — || February 14, 2004 || Kitt Peak || Spacewatch || H || align=right data-sort-value="0.79" | 790 m || 
|-id=922 bgcolor=#E9E9E9
| 253922 ||  || — || February 12, 2004 || Kitt Peak || Spacewatch || — || align=right | 2.6 km || 
|-id=923 bgcolor=#fefefe
| 253923 ||  || — || February 10, 2004 || Palomar || NEAT || — || align=right | 1.4 km || 
|-id=924 bgcolor=#fefefe
| 253924 ||  || — || February 11, 2004 || Kitt Peak || Spacewatch || — || align=right | 1.4 km || 
|-id=925 bgcolor=#fefefe
| 253925 ||  || — || February 13, 2004 || Kitt Peak || Spacewatch || — || align=right | 1.0 km || 
|-id=926 bgcolor=#fefefe
| 253926 ||  || — || February 13, 2004 || Kitt Peak || Spacewatch || V || align=right | 1.0 km || 
|-id=927 bgcolor=#fefefe
| 253927 ||  || — || February 11, 2004 || Palomar || NEAT || — || align=right data-sort-value="0.95" | 950 m || 
|-id=928 bgcolor=#fefefe
| 253928 ||  || — || February 11, 2004 || Kitt Peak || Spacewatch || — || align=right | 1.2 km || 
|-id=929 bgcolor=#fefefe
| 253929 ||  || — || February 11, 2004 || Palomar || NEAT || NYS || align=right data-sort-value="0.96" | 960 m || 
|-id=930 bgcolor=#fefefe
| 253930 ||  || — || February 11, 2004 || Palomar || NEAT || — || align=right data-sort-value="0.81" | 810 m || 
|-id=931 bgcolor=#fefefe
| 253931 ||  || — || February 11, 2004 || Palomar || NEAT || — || align=right | 1.1 km || 
|-id=932 bgcolor=#E9E9E9
| 253932 ||  || — || February 11, 2004 || Kitt Peak || Spacewatch || — || align=right | 2.0 km || 
|-id=933 bgcolor=#E9E9E9
| 253933 ||  || — || February 11, 2004 || Palomar || NEAT || — || align=right | 1.2 km || 
|-id=934 bgcolor=#E9E9E9
| 253934 ||  || — || February 12, 2004 || Kitt Peak || Spacewatch || — || align=right | 1.4 km || 
|-id=935 bgcolor=#fefefe
| 253935 ||  || — || February 14, 2004 || Socorro || LINEAR || V || align=right | 1.0 km || 
|-id=936 bgcolor=#fefefe
| 253936 ||  || — || February 11, 2004 || Palomar || NEAT || — || align=right | 1.3 km || 
|-id=937 bgcolor=#E9E9E9
| 253937 ||  || — || February 11, 2004 || Palomar || NEAT || RAF || align=right | 1.4 km || 
|-id=938 bgcolor=#E9E9E9
| 253938 ||  || — || February 15, 2004 || Catalina || CSS || — || align=right | 2.5 km || 
|-id=939 bgcolor=#E9E9E9
| 253939 ||  || — || February 12, 2004 || Palomar || NEAT || — || align=right | 1.6 km || 
|-id=940 bgcolor=#E9E9E9
| 253940 ||  || — || February 15, 2004 || Catalina || CSS || — || align=right | 1.2 km || 
|-id=941 bgcolor=#E9E9E9
| 253941 ||  || — || February 15, 2004 || Catalina || CSS || — || align=right | 3.7 km || 
|-id=942 bgcolor=#E9E9E9
| 253942 ||  || — || February 12, 2004 || Kitt Peak || Spacewatch || — || align=right | 2.2 km || 
|-id=943 bgcolor=#E9E9E9
| 253943 ||  || — || February 14, 2004 || Kitt Peak || Spacewatch || — || align=right | 1.2 km || 
|-id=944 bgcolor=#E9E9E9
| 253944 ||  || — || February 12, 2004 || Kitt Peak || Spacewatch || — || align=right | 1.6 km || 
|-id=945 bgcolor=#E9E9E9
| 253945 ||  || — || February 13, 2004 || Kitt Peak || Spacewatch || — || align=right | 1.7 km || 
|-id=946 bgcolor=#fefefe
| 253946 ||  || — || February 16, 2004 || Kitt Peak || Spacewatch || — || align=right data-sort-value="0.90" | 900 m || 
|-id=947 bgcolor=#E9E9E9
| 253947 ||  || — || February 16, 2004 || Socorro || LINEAR || — || align=right | 1.6 km || 
|-id=948 bgcolor=#E9E9E9
| 253948 ||  || — || February 17, 2004 || Kitt Peak || Spacewatch || — || align=right | 1.6 km || 
|-id=949 bgcolor=#E9E9E9
| 253949 ||  || — || February 17, 2004 || Socorro || LINEAR || — || align=right | 1.8 km || 
|-id=950 bgcolor=#E9E9E9
| 253950 ||  || — || February 18, 2004 || Catalina || CSS || — || align=right | 1.4 km || 
|-id=951 bgcolor=#fefefe
| 253951 ||  || — || February 16, 2004 || Socorro || LINEAR || ERI || align=right | 2.2 km || 
|-id=952 bgcolor=#E9E9E9
| 253952 ||  || — || February 17, 2004 || Kitt Peak || Spacewatch || — || align=right | 1.6 km || 
|-id=953 bgcolor=#E9E9E9
| 253953 ||  || — || February 18, 2004 || Catalina || CSS || EUN || align=right | 1.8 km || 
|-id=954 bgcolor=#E9E9E9
| 253954 ||  || — || February 19, 2004 || Socorro || LINEAR || — || align=right | 1.4 km || 
|-id=955 bgcolor=#E9E9E9
| 253955 ||  || — || February 19, 2004 || Socorro || LINEAR || — || align=right | 1.9 km || 
|-id=956 bgcolor=#fefefe
| 253956 ||  || — || February 19, 2004 || Socorro || LINEAR || H || align=right | 1.2 km || 
|-id=957 bgcolor=#E9E9E9
| 253957 ||  || — || February 20, 2004 || Haleakala || NEAT || — || align=right | 2.1 km || 
|-id=958 bgcolor=#E9E9E9
| 253958 ||  || — || February 18, 2004 || Haleakala || NEAT || — || align=right | 2.1 km || 
|-id=959 bgcolor=#E9E9E9
| 253959 ||  || — || February 19, 2004 || Socorro || LINEAR || JUN || align=right | 1.5 km || 
|-id=960 bgcolor=#fefefe
| 253960 ||  || — || February 25, 2004 || Desert Eagle || W. K. Y. Yeung || NYS || align=right data-sort-value="0.83" | 830 m || 
|-id=961 bgcolor=#fefefe
| 253961 ||  || — || February 16, 2004 || Socorro || LINEAR || H || align=right data-sort-value="0.95" | 950 m || 
|-id=962 bgcolor=#E9E9E9
| 253962 ||  || — || February 19, 2004 || Socorro || LINEAR || — || align=right | 3.5 km || 
|-id=963 bgcolor=#E9E9E9
| 253963 ||  || — || February 23, 2004 || Socorro || LINEAR || — || align=right | 1.5 km || 
|-id=964 bgcolor=#E9E9E9
| 253964 ||  || — || February 23, 2004 || Socorro || LINEAR || — || align=right | 1.4 km || 
|-id=965 bgcolor=#E9E9E9
| 253965 ||  || — || February 22, 2004 || Kitt Peak || Spacewatch || — || align=right | 1.0 km || 
|-id=966 bgcolor=#d6d6d6
| 253966 ||  || — || February 25, 2004 || Socorro || LINEAR || 3:2 || align=right | 8.1 km || 
|-id=967 bgcolor=#fefefe
| 253967 ||  || — || February 16, 2004 || Kitt Peak || Spacewatch || — || align=right data-sort-value="0.86" | 860 m || 
|-id=968 bgcolor=#fefefe
| 253968 ||  || — || February 17, 2004 || Catalina || CSS || — || align=right | 1.4 km || 
|-id=969 bgcolor=#fefefe
| 253969 ||  || — || March 12, 2004 || Palomar || NEAT || H || align=right | 1.0 km || 
|-id=970 bgcolor=#fefefe
| 253970 ||  || — || March 11, 2004 || Palomar || NEAT || MAS || align=right | 1.1 km || 
|-id=971 bgcolor=#E9E9E9
| 253971 ||  || — || March 15, 2004 || Socorro || LINEAR || — || align=right | 1.2 km || 
|-id=972 bgcolor=#fefefe
| 253972 ||  || — || March 11, 2004 || Palomar || NEAT || — || align=right | 2.0 km || 
|-id=973 bgcolor=#E9E9E9
| 253973 ||  || — || March 12, 2004 || Palomar || NEAT || — || align=right | 1.8 km || 
|-id=974 bgcolor=#d6d6d6
| 253974 ||  || — || March 14, 2004 || Kitt Peak || Spacewatch || Tj (2.99) || align=right | 5.6 km || 
|-id=975 bgcolor=#E9E9E9
| 253975 ||  || — || March 15, 2004 || Campo Imperatore || CINEOS || HNS || align=right | 1.6 km || 
|-id=976 bgcolor=#fefefe
| 253976 ||  || — || March 15, 2004 || Socorro || LINEAR || H || align=right data-sort-value="0.97" | 970 m || 
|-id=977 bgcolor=#E9E9E9
| 253977 ||  || — || March 13, 2004 || Palomar || NEAT || — || align=right | 1.3 km || 
|-id=978 bgcolor=#E9E9E9
| 253978 ||  || — || March 15, 2004 || Kitt Peak || Spacewatch || — || align=right | 1.8 km || 
|-id=979 bgcolor=#E9E9E9
| 253979 ||  || — || March 14, 2004 || Palomar || NEAT || — || align=right | 2.8 km || 
|-id=980 bgcolor=#E9E9E9
| 253980 ||  || — || March 15, 2004 || Kitt Peak || Spacewatch || — || align=right | 1.8 km || 
|-id=981 bgcolor=#E9E9E9
| 253981 ||  || — || March 15, 2004 || Kitt Peak || Spacewatch || — || align=right | 1.9 km || 
|-id=982 bgcolor=#E9E9E9
| 253982 ||  || — || March 15, 2004 || Catalina || CSS || — || align=right | 3.3 km || 
|-id=983 bgcolor=#fefefe
| 253983 ||  || — || March 15, 2004 || Catalina || CSS || NYS || align=right | 1.1 km || 
|-id=984 bgcolor=#E9E9E9
| 253984 ||  || — || March 15, 2004 || Palomar || NEAT || — || align=right | 1.4 km || 
|-id=985 bgcolor=#fefefe
| 253985 ||  || — || March 15, 2004 || Campo Imperatore || CINEOS || MAS || align=right data-sort-value="0.81" | 810 m || 
|-id=986 bgcolor=#fefefe
| 253986 ||  || — || March 15, 2004 || Palomar || NEAT || PHO || align=right | 1.2 km || 
|-id=987 bgcolor=#E9E9E9
| 253987 ||  || — || March 15, 2004 || Palomar || NEAT || — || align=right | 1.6 km || 
|-id=988 bgcolor=#E9E9E9
| 253988 ||  || — || March 15, 2004 || Palomar || NEAT || ADE || align=right | 4.3 km || 
|-id=989 bgcolor=#E9E9E9
| 253989 ||  || — || March 15, 2004 || Palomar || NEAT || EUN || align=right | 1.8 km || 
|-id=990 bgcolor=#E9E9E9
| 253990 ||  || — || March 12, 2004 || Palomar || NEAT || — || align=right | 1.1 km || 
|-id=991 bgcolor=#E9E9E9
| 253991 ||  || — || March 12, 2004 || Palomar || NEAT || — || align=right | 3.0 km || 
|-id=992 bgcolor=#fefefe
| 253992 ||  || — || March 12, 2004 || Palomar || NEAT || NYS || align=right data-sort-value="0.74" | 740 m || 
|-id=993 bgcolor=#E9E9E9
| 253993 ||  || — || March 13, 2004 || Palomar || NEAT || — || align=right | 2.6 km || 
|-id=994 bgcolor=#E9E9E9
| 253994 ||  || — || March 15, 2004 || Kitt Peak || Spacewatch || RAF || align=right | 1.0 km || 
|-id=995 bgcolor=#d6d6d6
| 253995 ||  || — || March 15, 2004 || Socorro || LINEAR || — || align=right | 3.9 km || 
|-id=996 bgcolor=#E9E9E9
| 253996 ||  || — || March 15, 2004 || Catalina || CSS || — || align=right | 1.3 km || 
|-id=997 bgcolor=#E9E9E9
| 253997 ||  || — || March 15, 2004 || Kitt Peak || Spacewatch || — || align=right | 1.3 km || 
|-id=998 bgcolor=#E9E9E9
| 253998 ||  || — || March 15, 2004 || Socorro || LINEAR || — || align=right | 1.5 km || 
|-id=999 bgcolor=#d6d6d6
| 253999 ||  || — || March 4, 2004 || Siding Spring || SSS || — || align=right | 3.2 km || 
|-id=000 bgcolor=#E9E9E9
| 254000 ||  || — || March 15, 2004 || Catalina || CSS || — || align=right | 3.7 km || 
|}

References

External links 
 Discovery Circumstances: Numbered Minor Planets (250001)–(255000) (IAU Minor Planet Center)

0253